

K – United States 

The prefix K is generally reserved for the contiguous United States. The ICAO codes for these airports are usually the FAA location identifier prefixed with a K. IATA codes are listed where applicable. Cities shown are those associated with the airport as per the FAA, this may not always be the exact location as airports are often located in smaller towns outside the cities they serve.

Format of entries is:
 ICAO (IATA) – Airport Name – Airport Location (U.S. city and state)

KA 

 KAAA – Logan County Airport – Lincoln, Illinois
 KAAF (AAF) – Apalachicola Regional Airport – Apalachicola, Florida
 KAAO – Colonel James Jabara Airport – Wichita, Kansas
 KAAS – Taylor County Airport – Campbellsville, Kentucky
 KAAT – Alturas Municipal Airport – Alturas, California
 KABE (ABE) – Lehigh Valley International Airport – Allentown, Bethlehem and Easton, Pennsylvania
 KABI (ABI) – Abilene Regional Airport – Abilene, Texas
 KABQ (ABQ) – Albuquerque International Sunport – Albuquerque, New Mexico
 KABR (ABR) – Aberdeen Regional Airport – Aberdeen, South Dakota
 KABY (ABY) – Southwest Georgia Regional Airport – Albany, Georgia
 KACB (ACB) – Antrim County Airport – Bellaire, Michigan
 KACJ – Jimmy Carter Regional Airport (formerly Souther Field) – Americus, Georgia
 KACK (ACK) – Nantucket Memorial Airport – Nantucket, Massachusetts
 KACP – Allen Parish Airport – Oakdale, Louisiana
 KACQ – Waseca Municipal Airport – Waseca, Minnesota
 KACT (ACT) – Waco Regional Airport – Waco, Texas
 KACV (ACV) – Arcata-Eureka Airport – Arcata, California
 KACY (ACY) – Atlantic City International Airport – Atlantic City, New Jersey
 KACZ – Henderson Field – Wallace, North Carolina
 KADC – Wadena Municipal Airport – Wadena, Minnesota
 KADF – Dexter B. Florence Memorial Field – Arkadelphia, Arkansas
 KADG (ADG) – Lenawee County Airport – Adrian, Michigan
 KADH (ADT) – Ada Municipal Airport – Ada, Oklahoma
 KADM (ADM) – Ardmore Municipal Airport – Ardmore, Oklahoma
 KADS (ADS) – Addison Airport – Addison, Texas
 KADT – Atwood–Rawlins County City–County Airport – Atwood, Kansas
 KADU – Audubon County Airport – Audubon, Iowa
 KADW (ADW) – Andrews Air Force Base – Camp Springs, Maryland
 KAEG – Double Eagle II Airport – Albuquerque, New Mexico
 KAEJ – Central Colorado Regional Airport – Buena Vista, Colorado
 KAEL (AEL) – Albert Lea Municipal Airport – Albert Lea, Minnesota
 KAEX (AEX) – Alexandria International Airport – Alexandria, Louisiana
 KAFF (AFF) – United States Air Force Academy Airfield – Colorado Springs, Colorado
 KAFJ (WSG) – Washington County Airport – Washington, Pennsylvania
 KAFK – Nebraska City Municipal Airport – Nebraska City, Nebraska
 KAFN (AFN) – Jaffrey Airport – Silver Ranch Airpark – Jaffrey, New Hampshire
 KAFO (AFO) – Afton Municipal Airport (Afton-Lincoln County Airport) – Afton, Wyoming
 KAFP – Anson County Airport – Wadesboro, North Carolina
 KAFW (AFW) – Fort Worth Alliance Airport – Fort Worth, Texas
 KAGC (AGC) – Allegheny County Airport – West Mifflin, Pennsylvania
 KAGO (AGO) – Magnolia Municipal Airport – Magnolia, Arkansas
 KAGR – MacDill AFB Auxiliary Field – Avon Park, Florida
 KAGS (AGS) – Augusta Regional Airport at Bush Field – Augusta, Georgia
 KAGZ – Wagner Municipal Airport – Wagner, South Dakota
 KAHC (AHC) – Amedee Army Airfield – Herlong, California
 KAHH (AHH) – Amery Municipal Airport – Amery, Wisconsin
 KAHN (AHN) – Athens Ben Epps Airport – Athens, Georgia
 KAHQ – Wahoo Municipal Airport – Wahoo, Nebraska
 KAIA (AIA) – Alliance Municipal Airport – Alliance, Nebraska
 KAIB – Hopkins-Montrose County Airport – Nucla, Colorado
 KAID (AID) – Anderson Municipal Airport (Darlington Field) – Anderson, Indiana
 KAIG – Langlade County Airport – Antigo, Wisconsin
 KAIK (AIK) – Aiken Regional Airport – Aiken, South Carolina
 KAIO (AIO) – Atlantic Municipal Airport – Atlantic, Iowa
 KAIT – Aitkin Municipal Airport (Steve Kurtz Field) – Aitkin, Minnesota
 KAIV (AIV) – George Downer Airport – Aliceville, Alabama
 KAIY (AIY) – Atlantic City Municipal Airport (Bader Field) – Atlantic City, New Jersey (closed 2006)
 KAIZ (AIZ) – Lee C. Fine Memorial Airport – Lake Ozark, Missouri
 KAJG – Mount Carmel Municipal Airport – Mount Carmel, Illinois
 KAJO – Corona Municipal Airport – Corona, California
 KAJR – Habersham County Airport – Cornelia, Georgia
 KAJZ – Blake Field – Delta, Colorado
 KAKH – Gastonia Municipal Airport – Gastonia, North Carolina
 KAKO (AKO) – Colorado Plains Regional Airport – Akron, Colorado
 KAKQ – Wakefield Municipal Airport – Wakefield, Virginia
 KAKR (AKC) – Akron Fulton Executive Airport – Akron, Ohio
 KALB (ALB) – Albany International Airport – Albany, New York
 KALI (ALI) – Alice International Airport – Alice, Texas
 KALK - Airstrip west of Libby AAF See KFHU
 KALM (ALM) – Alamogordo–White Sands Regional Airport – Alamogordo, New Mexico
 KALN (ALN) – St. Louis Regional Airport – Alton, Illinois
 KALO (ALO) – Waterloo Regional Airport – Waterloo, Iowa
 KALS (ALS) – San Luis Valley Regional Airport – Alamosa, Colorado
 KALW (ALW) – Walla Walla Regional Airport – Walla Walla, Washington
 KALX (ALX) – Thomas C. Russell Field – Alexander City, Alabama
 KAMA (AMA) – Rick Husband Amarillo International Airport – Amarillo, Texas
 KAMG – Bacon County Airport – Alma, Georgia
 KAMN (AMN) – Gratiot Community Airport – Alma, Michigan
 KAMT – Alexander Salamon Airport – West Union, Ohio
 KAMW (AMW) – Ames Municipal Airport – Ames, Iowa
 KANB (ANB) – Anniston Regional Airport – Anniston, Alabama
 KAND (AND) – Anderson Regional Airport – Anderson, South Carolina
 KANE – Anoka County–Blaine Airport (Janes Field) – Minneapolis
 KANJ – Sault Ste. Marie Municipal Airport (Sanderson Field) – Sault Ste. Marie, Michigan
 KANK – Harriet Alexander Field – Salida, Colorado
 KANP (ANP) – Lee Airport – Annapolis, Maryland
 KANQ (ANQ) – Tri-State Steuben County Airport – Angola, Indiana
 KANW (ANW) – Ainsworth Regional Airport – Ainsworth, Nebraska
 KANY (ANY) – Anthony Municipal Airport – Anthony, Kansas
 KAOC – Arco Butte County Airport – Arco, Idaho
 KAOH (AOH) – Lima Allen County Airport – Lima, Ohio
 KAOO (AOO) – Altoona–Blair County Airport – Altoona, Pennsylvania
 KAOV – Ava Bill Martin Memorial Airport – Ava, Missouri
 KAPA (APA) – Centennial Airport – Centennial, Colorado
 KAPC (APC) – Napa County Airport (Napa Valley Airport) – Napa, California
 KAPF (APF) – Naples Airport – Naples, Florida
 KAPG (APG) – Phillips Army Airfield – Aberdeen Proving Ground, Maryland
 KAPH (APH) – A.P. Hill Army Airfield – Fort A.P. Hill, Virginia
 KAPN (APN) – Alpena County Regional Airport – Alpena, Michigan
 KAPT (APT) – Marion County Airport (Brown Field) – Jasper, Tennessee
 KAPV (APV) – Apple Valley Airport – Apple Valley, California
 KAQO – Llano Municipal Airport – Llano, Texas
 KAQP – Appleton Municipal Airport – Appleton, Minnesota
 KAQR – Atoka Municipal Airport – Atoka, Oklahoma
 KAQW – Harriman-and-West Airport – North Adams, Massachusetts
 KARA (ARA) – Acadiana Regional Airport – New Iberia, Louisiana
 KARB (ARB) – Ann Arbor Municipal Airport – Ann Arbor, Michigan
 KARG (ARG) – Walnut Ridge Regional Airport – Walnut Ridge, Arkansas
 KARM (WHT) – Wharton Regional Airport – Wharton, Texas
 KARR (AUZ) – Aurora Municipal Airport (Chicago/Aurora Municipal Airport) – Aurora, Illinois
 KART (ART) – Watertown International Airport – Watertown, New York
 KARV (ARV) – Lakeland Airport (Noble F. Lee Memorial Field) – Minocqua / Woodruff, Wisconsin
 KARW (BFT) – Beaufort County Airport (Frogmore Island Airport) – Beaufort County, South Carolina
 KASD – Slidell Airport – Slidell, Louisiana
 KASE (ASE) – Aspen–Pitkin County Airport – Aspen, Colorado
 KASG (SPZ) – Springdale Municipal Airport – Springdale, Arkansas
 KASH (ASH) – Nashua Airport (Boire Field) – Nashua, New Hampshire
 KASJ – Tri-County Airport – Ahoskie, North Carolina
 KASL (ASL) – Harrison County Airport – Marshall, Texas
 KASN (ASN) – Talladega Municipal Airport – Talladega, Alabama
 KAST (AST) – Astoria Regional Airport – Astoria, Oregon
 KASW – Warsaw Municipal Airport – Warsaw, Indiana
 KASX (ASX) – John F. Kennedy Memorial Airport – Ashland, Wisconsin
 KASY (ASY) – Ashley Municipal Airport – Ashley, North Dakota
 KATA – Hall–Miller Municipal Airport – Atlanta, Texas
 KATL (ATL) – Hartsfield–Jackson Atlanta International Airport – Atlanta
 KATS (ATS) – Artesia Municipal Airport – Artesia, New Mexico
 KATW (ATW) – Appleton International Airport – Greenville, Wisconsin (near Appleton)
 KATY (ATY) – Watertown Regional Airport – Watertown, South Dakota
 KAUG (AUG) – Augusta State Airport – Augusta, Maine
 KAUH – Aurora Municipal Airport (Al Potter Field) – Aurora, Nebraska
 KAUM (AUM) – Austin Municipal Airport – Austin, Minnesota
 KAUN (AUN) – Auburn Municipal Airport – Auburn, California
 KAUO (AUO) – Auburn University Regional Airport (Robert G. Pitts Field) – Auburn, Alabama
 KAUS (AUS) – Austin–Bergstrom International Airport – Austin, Texas
 KAUW (AUW) – Wausau Downtown Airport – Wausau, Wisconsin
 KAVC – Mecklenburg-Brunswick Regional Airport – South Hill, Virginia
 KAVK – Alva Regional Airport – Alva, Oklahoma
 KAVL (AVL) – Asheville Regional Airport – Fletcher, North Carolina
 KAVO (AVO) – Avon Park Executive Airport – Avon Park, Florida
 KAVP (AVP) – Wilkes-Barre/Scranton International Airport – Avoca, Pennsylvania
 KAVQ (AVW) – Marana Regional Airport (Avra Valley Airport) – Marana, Arizona
 KAVX (CIB) – Catalina Airport (Airport in the Sky) – Avalon / Santa Catalina Island, California
 KAWG – Washington Municipal Airport – Washington, Iowa
 KAWM (AWM) – West Memphis Municipal Airport – West Memphis, Arkansas
 KAWO – Arlington Municipal Airport – Arlington, Washington
 KAXA (AXG) – Algona Municipal Airport – Algona, Iowa
 KAXH – Houston Southwest Airport – Arcola, Texas
 KAXN (AXN) – Alexandria Municipal Airport (Chandler Field) – Alexandria, Minnesota
 KAXQ – Clarion County Airport – Clarion, Pennsylvania
 KAXS (AXS) – Altus/Quartz Mountain Regional Airport – Altus, Oklahoma
 KAXV (AXV) – Neil Armstrong Airport (Auglaize County Airport) – Wapakoneta, Ohio
 KAXX (AXX) – Angel Fire Airport – Angel Fire, New Mexico
 KAYS (AYS) – Waycross–Ware County Airport – Waycross, Georgia
 KAYX – Arnold Air Force Base – Tullahoma, Tennessee
 KAZC – Colorado City Municipal Airport – Colorado City, Arizona
 KAZE – Hazlehurst Airport – Hazlehurst, Georgia
 KAZO (AZO) – Kalamazoo/Battle Creek International Airport – Kalamazoo / Battle Creek, Michigan
 KAZU – Arrowhead Assault Strip – Fort Chaffee, Arkansas

KB 

 KBAB (BAB) – Beale Air Force Base – Marysville, California
 KBAC - Barnes County Municipal Airport - Valley City, North Dakota
 KBAD (BAD) – Barksdale Air Force Base – Bossier City, Louisiana
 KBAF (BAF) – Westfield-Barnes Regional Airport – Westfield / Springfield, Massachusetts
 KBAK (CLU) – Columbus Municipal Airport – Columbus, Indiana
 KBAM (BAM) – Battle Mountain Airport (Lander County Airport) – Battle Mountain, Nevada
 KBAN - Bryant Field - Bridgeport, California
 KBAX – Huron County Memorial Airport – Bad Axe, Michigan
 KBAZ – New Braunfels Regional Airport – New Braunfels, Texas
 KBBB (BBB) – Benson Municipal Airport – Benson, Minnesota
 KBBD – Curtis Field – Brady, Texas
 KBBG (BKG) – Branson Airport  – Branson, Missouri
 KBBP (BTN) – Marlboro County Jetport (H.E. Avent Field) – Bennettsville, South Carolina
 KBBW (BBW) – Broken Bow Municipal Airport (Keith Glaze Field) – Broken Bow, Nebraska
 KBCB (BCB) – VirginiaTech/Montgomery Executive Airport – Blacksburg, Virginia
 KBCE (BCE) – Bryce Canyon Airport – Bryce Canyon, Utah
 KBCK – Black River Falls Area Airport – Black River Falls, Wisconsin
 KBCT (BCT) – Boca Raton Airport – Boca Raton, Florida
 KBDE (BDE) – Baudette International Airport – Baudette, Minnesota
 KBDG (BDG) – Blanding Municipal Airport – Blanding, Utah
 KBDH (ILL) – Willmar Municipal Airport (John L. Rice Field) – Willmar, Minnesota
 KBDJ – Boulder Junction Airport – Boulder Junction, Wisconsin
 KBDL (BDL) – Bradley International Airport – Windsor Locks / Hartford, Connecticut
 KBDN - Bend Municipal Airport - Bend, Oregon
 KBDQ – Morrilton Municipal Airport – Morrilton, Arkansas
 KBDR (BDR) – Igor I. Sikorsky Memorial Airport – Bridgeport, Connecticut
 KBDU – Boulder Municipal Airport – Boulder, Colorado

 KBEC (BEC) – Beech Factory Airport – Wichita, Kansas
 KBED (BED) – Laurence G. Hanscom Field – Bedford, Massachusetts
 KBEH (BEH) – Southwest Michigan Regional Airport – Benton Harbor, Michigan
 KBFA – Boyne Mountain Airport – Boyne Falls, Michigan
 KBFD (BFD) – Bradford Regional Airport – Bradford, Pennsylvania
 KBFE – Terry County Airport – Brownfield, Texas
 KBFF (BFF) – Western Nebraska Regional Airport (William B. Heilig Field) – Scottsbluff, Nebraska
 KBFI (BFI) – Boeing Field/King County International Airport – Seattle, Washington
 KBFK – Buffalo Municipal Airport – Buffalo, Oklahoma
 KBFL (BFL) – Meadows Field Airport – Bakersfield, California
 KBFM (BFM) – Mobile Downtown Airport – Mobile, Alabama
 KBFR (BFR) – Virgil I. Grissom Municipal Airport – Bedford, Indiana
 KBFW – Silver Bay Municipal Airport – Silver Bay, Minnesota
 KBGD – Hutchinson County Airport – Borger, Texas
 KBGE (BGE) – Decatur County Industrial Air Park – Bainbridge, Georgia
 KBGF – Winchester Municipal Airport – Winchester, Tennessee
 KBGM (BGM) – Greater Binghamton Airport – Binghamton, New York
 KBGR (BGR) – Bangor International Airport – Bangor, Maine
 KBHB (BHB) – Hancock County-Bar Harbor Airport – Bar Harbor, Maine
 KBHC – Baxley Municipal Airport – Baxley, Georgia
 KBHK – Baker Municipal Airport – Baker, Montana
 KBHM (BHM) – Birmingham-Shuttlesworth International Airport – Birmingham, Alabama
 KBID (BID) – Block Island State Airport – Block Island, Rhode Island
 KBIE – Beatrice Municipal Airport – Beatrice, Nebraska
 KBIF (BIF) – Biggs Army Airfield – Fort Bliss, El Paso, Texas
 KBIH (BIH) – Eastern Sierra Regional Airport – Bishop, California
 KBIL (BIL) – Billings Logan International Airport – Billings, Montana
 KBIS (BIS) – Bismarck Municipal Airport – Bismarck, North Dakota
 KBIV (BIV) – West Michigan Regional Airport – Holland, Michigan
 KBIX (BIX) – Keesler Air Force Base – Biloxi, Mississippi
 KBJC (BJC) – Rocky Mountain Metropolitan Airport – Denver, Colorado
 KBJI (BJI) – Bemidji Regional Airport – Bemidji, Minnesota
 KBJJ (BJJ) – Wayne County Airport – Wooster, Ohio
 KBJN - Tonopah Test Range Airport - Tonopah, Nevada
 KBKD – Stephens County Airport – Breckenridge, Texas
 KBKE (BKE) – Baker City Municipal Airport – Baker City, Oregon
 KBKF – Buckley Space Force Base – Aurora, Colorado
 KBKL (BKL) – Cleveland Burke Lakefront Airport – Cleveland, Ohio
 KBKN - Blackwell-Tonkawa Municipal Airport - Blackwell, Oklahoma
 KBKS – Brooks County Airport – Falfurrias, Texas
 KBKT (BKT) – Allen C. Perkinson Airport / Blackstone Army Airfield – Blackstone, Virginia
 KBKV – Brooksville-Tampa Bay Regional Airport – Brooksville, Florida
 KBKW (BKW) – Raleigh County Memorial Airport – Beckley, West Virginia
 KBKX (BKX) – Brookings Municipal Airport – Brookings, South Dakota
 KBLF (BLF) – Mercer County Airport – Bluefield, West Virginia
 KBLH (BLH) – Blythe Airport – Blythe, California
 KBLI (BLI) – Bellingham International Airport – Bellingham, Washington
 KBLM (BLM) – Monmouth Executive Airport – Belmar / Farmingdale, New Jersey
 KBLU – Blue Canyon-Nyack Airport – Emigrant Gap, California
 KBLV (BLV) – MidAmerica St. Louis Airport / Scott Air Force Base – Belleville, Illinois
 KBMC (BMC) – Brigham City Airport – Brigham City, Utah
 KBMG (BMG) – Monroe County Airport – Bloomington, Indiana
 KBMI (BMI) – Central Illinois Regional Airport – Bloomington, Illinois
 KBML (BML) – Berlin Regional Airport – Berlin, New Hampshire
 KBMQ – Burnet Municipal Airport (Kate Craddock Field) – Burnet, Texas
 KBMT (BMT) – Beaumont Municipal Airport – Beaumont, Texas
 KBNA (BNA) – Nashville International Airport – Nashville, Tennessee
 KBNG (BNG) – Banning Municipal Airport – Banning, California
 KBNL – Barnwell Regional Airport – Barnwell, South Carolina
 KBNO (BNO) – Burns Municipal Airport – Burns, Oregon
 KBNW – Boone Municipal Airport – Boone, Iowa
 KBOI (BOI) – Boise Air Terminal (Gowen Field) – Boise, Idaho
 KBOK – Brookings Airport – Brookings, Oregon
 KBOS (BOS) – Logan International Airport – Boston, Massachusetts
 KBOW (BOW) – Bartow Executive Airport – Bartow, Florida
 KBPG – Big Spring McMahon-Wrinkle Airport – Big Spring, Texas
 KBPI (BPI) – Miley Memorial Field – Big Piney, Wyoming
 KBPK (WMH) – Ozark Regional Airport (formerly Baxter County Regional Airport) – Mountain Home, Arkansas
 KBPP (BWM) – Bowman Municipal Airport – Bowman, North Dakota
 KBPT (BPT) – Jack Brooks Regional Airport – Nederland, Texas (near Beaumont & Port Arthur)
 KBQK (BQK) – Brunswick Golden Isles Airport – Brunswick, Georgia
 KBQR (BQR) – Buffalo-Lancaster Regional Airport – Lancaster, New York
 KBRD (BRD) – Brainerd Lakes Regional Airport – Brainerd, Minnesota
 KBRL (BRL) – Southeast Iowa Regional Airport – Burlington, Iowa
 KBRO (BRO) – Brownsville/South Padre Island International Airport – Brownsville, Texas
 KBRY – Samuels Field – Bardstown, Kentucky
 KBST – Belfast Municipal Airport – Belfast, Maine
 KBTA - Blair Municipal Airport - Blair, Nebraska
 KBTF (BTF) – Skypark Airport – Bountiful, Utah
 KBTL (BTL) – W. K. Kellogg Airport – Battle Creek, Michigan
 KBTM (BTM) – Bert Mooney Airport – Butte, Montana
 KBTN – Britton Municipal Airport – Britton, South Dakota
 KBTP (BTP) – Pittsburgh-Butler Regional Airport (K.W. Scholter Field) – Butler, Pennsylvania
 KBTR (BTR) – Baton Rouge Metropolitan Airport – Baton Rouge, Louisiana
 KBTV (BTV) – Burlington International Airport – Burlington, Vermont
 KBTY (BTY) – Beatty Airport – Beatty, Nevada
 KBUB – Cram Field – Burwell, Nebraska
 KBUF (BUF) – Buffalo Niagara International Airport – Buffalo, New York
 KBUM – Butler Memorial Airport – Butler, Missouri
 KBUR (BUR) – Hollywood Burbank Airport (Bob Hope Airport)  – Burbank, California
 KBUU – Burlington Municipal Airport – Burlington, Wisconsin
 KBUY – Burlington-Alamance Regional Airport – Burlington, North Carolina
 KBVI (BFP) – Beaver County Airport – Beaver Falls, Pennsylvania
 KBVN – Albion Municipal Airport – Albion, Nebraska
 KBVO (BVO) – Bartlesville Municipal Airport – Bartlesville, Oklahoma
 KBVS (MVW) – Skagit Regional Airport – Burlington & Mount Vernon, Washington
 KBVU - Boulder City Municipal Airport - Boulder City, Nevada
 KBVX (BVX) – Batesville Regional Airport – Batesville, Arkansas
 KBVY (BVY) – Beverly Regional Airport – Beverly, Massachusetts
 KBWC (BWC) – Brawley Municipal Airport – Brawley, California
 KBWD (BWD) – Brownwood Regional Airport – Brownwood, Texas
 KBWG (BWG) – Bowling Green-Warren County Regional Airport – Bowling Green, Kentucky
 KBWI (BWI) – Baltimore-Washington International Thurgood Marshall Airport – Baltimore, Maryland & Washington, D.C.
 KBWP – Harry Stern Airport – Wahpeton, North Dakota
 KBXA (BXA) – George R. Carr Memorial Airfield – Bogalusa, Louisiana
 KBXG – Burke County Airport – Waynesboro, Georgia
 KBXK (BXK) – Buckeye Municipal Airport – Buckeye, Arizona
 KBXM (BXM) – Brunswick Executive Airport (formerly NAS Brunswick) – Brunswick, Maine
 KBYG (BYG) – Johnson County Airport – Buffalo, Wyoming
 KBYH (BYH) – Arkansas International Airport – Blytheville, Arkansas
 KBYI (BYI) – Burley Municipal Airport – Burley, Idaho
 KBYS – Bicycle Lake Army Airfield (Fort Irwin) – Barstow, California
 KBYY (BBC) – Bay City Municipal Airport – Bay City, Texas
 KBZN (BZN) – Bozeman Yellowstone International Airport (Gallatin Field)  – Bozeman, Montana

KC 

 KCAD (CAD) – Wexford County Airport – Cadillac, Michigan
 KCAE (CAE) – Columbia Metropolitan Airport – West Columbia, South Carolina (near Columbia)
 KCAG (CIG) – Craig-Moffat Airport – Craig, Colorado
 KCAK (CAK) – Akron-Canton Regional Airport – Akron, Ohio (near Canton)
 KCAO (CAO) – Clayton Municipal Airpark – Clayton, New Mexico
 KCAR (CAR) – Caribou Municipal Airport – Caribou, Maine
 KCAV – Clarion Municipal Airport – Clarion, Iowa
 KCBE (CBE) – Greater Cumberland Regional Airport – Cumberland, Maryland
 KCBF (CBF) – Council Bluffs Municipal Airport – Council Bluffs, Iowa
 KCBG – Cambridge Municipal Airport – Cambridge, Minnesota
 KCBK (CBK) – Colby Municipal Airport (Shalz Field)  – Colby, Kansas
 KCBM (CBM) – Columbus Air Force Base – Columbus, Mississippi
 KCCA – Clinton Municipal Airport – Clinton, Arkansas
 KCCB (CCB) – Cable Airport – Upland, California
 KCCO – Newnan-Coweta County Airport – Newnan, Georgia
 KCCR (CCR) – Buchanan Field Airport – Concord, California
 KCCY (CCY) – Northeast Iowa Regional Airport – Charles City, Iowa
 KCDA (LLX) – Caledonia County Airport – Lyndonville, Vermont
 KCDC (CDC) – Cedar City Regional Airport – Cedar City, Utah
 KCDD – Scotts Seaplane Base – Crane Lake, Minnesota
 KCDH – Harrell Field (Camden Municipal/Regional Airport)  – Camden, Arkansas
 KCDI – Cambridge Municipal Airport – Cambridge, Ohio
 KCDK (CDK) – George T. Lewis Airport – Cedar Key, Florida
 KCDN (CDN) – Woodward Field (Kershaw County Airport) – Camden, South Carolina
 KCDR (CDR) – Chadron Municipal Airport – Chadron, Nebraska
 KCDS (CDS) – Childress Municipal Airport – Childress, Texas
 KCDW (CDW) – Essex County Airport (Caldwell Airport) – Caldwell, New Jersey
 KCEA (CEA) – Cessna Aircraft Field – Wichita, Kansas
 KCEC (CEC) – Del Norte County Airport (Jack McNamara Field)  – Crescent City, California
 KCEF (CEF) – Westover Metropolitan Airport / Westover Air Reserve Base – Springfield / Chicopee, Massachusetts
 KCEK – Crete Municipal Airport – Crete, Nebraska
 KCEU (CEU) – Oconee County Regional Airport – Clemson, South Carolina
 KCEV (CEV) – Mettel Field – Connersville, Indiana
 KCEW (CEW) – Bob Sikes Airport – Crestview, Florida
 KCEY (CEY) – Murray-Calloway County Airport (Kyle-Oakley Field) – Murray, Kentucky
 KCEZ (CEZ) – Cortez Municipal Airport – Cortez, Colorado
 KCFD (CFD) – Coulter Field – Bryan, Texas
 KCFE – Buffalo Municipal Airport – Buffalo, Minnesota
 KCFJ – Crawfordsville Municipal Airport – Crawfordsville, Indiana
 KCFS – Tuscola Area Airport – Caro, Michigan
 KCFT (CFT) – Greenlee County Airport – Clifton / Morenci, Arizona
 KCFV (CFV) – Coffeyville Municipal Airport – Coffeyville, Kansas
 KCGC – Crystal River Airport (Captain Tom Davis Field) – Crystal River, Florida
 KCGE (CGE) – Cambridge-Dorchester Regional Airport – Cambridge, Maryland
 KCGF (CGF) – Cuyahoga County Airport – Cleveland, Ohio
 KCGI (CGI) – Cape Girardeau Regional Airport – Cape Girardeau, Missouri
 KCGS (CGS) – College Park Airport – College Park, Maryland
 KCGX - Meigs Field - Chicago, Illinois (closed 2003)
 KCGZ (CGZ) – Casa Grande Municipal Airport – Casa Grande, Arizona
 KCHA (CHA) – Chattanooga Metropolitan Airport – Chattanooga, Tennessee
 KCHD – Chandler Municipal Airport – Chandler, Arizona
 KCHK (CHK) – Chickasha Municipal Airport – Chickasha, Oklahoma
 KCHN – Wauchula Municipal Airport – Wauchula, Florida
 KCHO (CHO) – Charlottesville-Albemarle Airport – Charlottesville, Virginia
 KCHQ – Mississippi County Airport – Charleston, Missouri
 KCHS (CHS) – Charleston International Airport (Charleston Air Force Base) – Charleston, South Carolina
 KCHT – Chillicothe Municipal Airport – Chillicothe, Missouri
 KCHU – Houston County Airport – Caledonia, Minnesota
 KCIC (CIC) – Chico Municipal Airport – Chico, California
 KCID (CID) – The Eastern Iowa Airport – Cedar Rapids, Iowa
 KCII – Choteau Airport – Choteau, Montana
 KCIN (CIN) – Arthur N. Neu Airport – Carroll, Iowa
 KCIR – Cairo Regional Airport – Cairo, Illinois
 KCIU (CIU) – Chippewa County International Airport – Sault Ste Marie, Michigan
 KCJJ – Ellen Church Field – Cresco, Iowa
 KCJR – Culpeper Regional Airport – Culpeper, Virginia
 KCKA (CKA) – Kegelman Air Force Auxiliary Field – Cherokee, Oklahoma
 KCKB (CKB) – North Central West Virginia Airport – Clarksburg, West Virginia
 KCKC (GRM) – Grand Marais/Cook County Airport – Grand Marais, Minnesota
 KCKF (CKF) – Crisp County-Cordele Airport – Cordele, Georgia
 KCKI – Williamsburg Regional Airport – Kingstree, South Carolina
 KCKM – Fletcher Field – Clarksdale, Mississippi
 KCKN (CKN) – Crookston Municipal Airport – Crookston, Minnesota
 KCKP – Cherokee Municipal Airport – Cherokee, Iowa
 KCKV (CKV) – Clarksville-Montgomery County Regional Airport (John F. Outlaw Field) – Clarksville, Tennessee
 KCLE (CLE) – Cleveland Hopkins International Airport – Cleveland, Ohio
 KCLI (CLI) – Clintonville Municipal Airport – Clintonville, Wisconsin
 KCLK – Clinton Regional Airport – Clinton, Oklahoma
 KCLL (CLL) – Easterwood Airport – College Station, Texas
 KCLM (CLM) – William R. Fairchild International Airport – Port Angeles, Washington
 KCLR (CLR) – Cliff Hatfield Memorial Airport – Calipatria, California
 KCLS (CLS) – Chehalis-Centralia Airport – Chehalis, Washington
 KCLT (CLT) – Charlotte/Douglas International Airport – Charlotte, North Carolina
 KCLW (CLW) – Clearwater Air Park – Clearwater, Florida
 KCMA – Camarillo Airport – Camarillo, California
 KCMH (CMH) – John Glenn Columbus International Airport – Columbus, Ohio
 KCMI (CMI) – University of Illinois Willard Airport – Savoy, Illinois (Champaign-Urbana area)
 KCMR – H.A. Clark Memorial Field – Williams, Arizona
 KCMX (CMX) – Houghton County Memorial Airport – Hancock, Michigan
 KCMY (CMY) – Sparta/Fort McCoy Airport – Sparta, Wisconsin
 KCNC – Chariton Municipal Airport – Chariton, Iowa
 KCNH (CNH) – Claremont Municipal Airport – Claremont, New Hampshire
 KCNI – Cherokee County Regional Airport – Canton, Georgia
 KCNK (CNK) – Blosser Municipal Airport – Concordia, Kansas
 KCNM (CNM) – Cavern City Air Terminal – Carlsbad, New Mexico
 KCNO (CNO) – Chino Airport – Chino, California
 KCNP – Billy G. Ray Field – Chappell, Nebraska
 KCNU (CNU) – Chanute Martin Johnson Airport – Chanute, Kansas
 KCNW (CNW) – TSTC Waco Airport – Waco, Texas
 KCNY (CNY) – Canyonlands Regional Airport – Moab, Utah
 KCOD (COD) – Yellowstone Regional Airport – Cody, Wyoming
 KCOE (COE) – Coeur d'Alene Air Terminal – Coeur d'Alene, Idaho
 KCOF (COF) – Patrick Space Force Base – Cocoa Beach, Florida
 KCOI (COI) – Merritt Island Airport – Merritt Island, Florida
 KCOM – Coleman Municipal Airport – Coleman, Texas
 KCON (CON) – Concord Municipal Airport – Concord, New Hampshire
 KCOQ – Cloquet Carlton County Airport – Cloquet, Minnesota
 KCOS (COS) – Colorado Springs Airport (City of Colorado Springs Municipal Airport) – Colorado Springs, Colorado
 KCOT (COT) – Cotulla-La Salle County Airport – Cotulla, Texas
 KCOU (COU) – Columbia Regional Airport – Columbia, Missouri
 KCPC – Columbus County Municipal Airport – Whiteville, North Carolina
 KCPF – Wendell H. Ford Airport – Hazard, Kentucky 
 KCPK – Chesapeake Regional Airport – Norfolk, Virginia
 KCPM (CPM) – Compton/Woodley Airport – Compton, California
 KCPR (CPR) – Natrona County International Airport – Casper, Wyoming
 KCPS (CPS) – St. Louis Downtown Airport – Cahokia, Illinois
 KCPT – Cleburne Regional Airport – Cleburne, Texas
 KCPU (CPU) – Calaveras County Airport (Maury Rasmussen Field) – San Andreas, California
 KCQA – Lakefield Airport – Celina, Ohio
 KCQB – Chandler Regional Airport – Chandler, Oklahoma
 KCQC - Moriarty Municipal Airport - Moriarty, New Mexico
 KCQF – H. L. Sonny Callahan Airport – Fairhope, Alabama
 KCQM – Cook Municipal Airport – Cook, Minnesota
 KCQW (HCW) – Cheraw Municipal Airport (Lynch Bellinger Field) – Cheraw, South Carolina
 KCQX – Chatham Municipal Airport – Chatham, Massachusetts
 KCRE (CRE) – Grand Strand Airport – North Myrtle Beach, South Carolina
 KCRG (CRG) – Jacksonville Executive at Craig Airport – Jacksonville, Florida
 KCRO (CRO) – Corcoran Airport – Corcoran, California
 KCRP (CRP) – Corpus Christi International Airport – Corpus Christi, Texas
 KCRQ (CLD) – McClellan-Palomar Airport – Carlsbad, California
 KCRS – Corsicana Municipal Airport (C. David Campbell Field) – Corsicana, Texas
 KCRT (CRT) – Z.M. Jack Stell Field – Crossett, Arkansas
 KCRW (CRW) – Yeager Airport – Charleston, West Virginia
 KCRX (CRX) – Roscoe Turner Airport – Corinth, Mississippi
 KCRZ – Corning Municipal Airport – Corning, Iowa
 KCSB – Cambridge Municipal Airport – Cambridge, Nebraska
 KCSG (CSG) – Columbus Airport – Columbus, Georgia
 KCSM (CSM) – Clinton-Sherman Industrial Airpark (Oklahoma Air & Space Port) – Clinton, Oklahoma
 KCSQ (CSQ) – Creston Municipal Airport – Creston, Iowa
 KCSV (CSV) – Crossville Memorial Airport (Whitson Field) – Crossville, Tennessee
 KCTB (CTB) – Cut Bank Municipal Airport – Cut Bank, Montana
 KCTJ – West Georgia Regional Airport (O.V. Gray Field) – Carrollton, Georgia
 KCTK – Ingersoll Airport – Canton, Illinois
 KCTY (CTY) – Cross City Airport – Cross City, Florida
 KCTZ (CTZ) – Clinton-Sampson County Airport – Clinton, North Carolina
 KCUB (CUB) – Columbia Owens Downtown Airport – Columbia, South Carolina
 KCUH – Cushing Municipal Airport – Cushing, Oklahoma
 KCUL – Carmi Municipal Airport – Carmi, Illinois
 KCUT – Custer County Airport – Custer, South Dakota
 KCVG (CVG) – Cincinnati/Northern Kentucky International Airport – Hebron, Kentucky (near Cincinnati, Ohio and Covington, Kentucky)
 KCVH (HLI) – Hollister Municipal Airport – Hollister, California
 KCVK – Sharp County Regional Airport – Ash Flat, Arkansas
 KCVN (CVN) – Clovis Municipal Airport – Clovis, New Mexico
 KCVO (CVO) – Corvallis Municipal Airport – Corvallis, Oregon
 KCVS (CVS) – Cannon Air Force Base – Clovis, New Mexico
 KCVX – Charlevoix Municipal Airport – Charlevoix, Michigan
 KCWA (CWA) – Central Wisconsin Airport – Mosinee, Wisconsin
 KCWC - Kickapoo Downtown Airpark - Wichita Falls, Texas
 KCWF (CWF) – Chennault International Airport – Lake Charles, Louisiana
 KCWI – Clinton Municipal Airport – Clinton, Iowa
 KCWS – Dennis F. Cantrell Field – Conway, Arkansas (closed/replaced, see: KCXW)
 KCWV – Claxton-Evans County Airport – Claxton, Georgia
 KCXE – Chase City Municipal Airport – Chase City, Virginia
 KCXL (CXL) – Calexico International Airport – Calexico, California
 KCXO (CXO) – Lone Star Executive Airport – Houston, Texas
 KCXP (CXP) – Carson City Airport – Carson City, Nevada
 KCXU – Camilla-Mitchell County Airport – Camilla, Georgia
 KCXW – Conway Municipal Airport (Cantrell Field) – Conway, Arkansas
 KCXY (HAR) – Capital City Airport – Harrisburg, Pennsylvania
 KCYO – Pickaway County Memorial Airport – Circleville, Ohio
 KCYS (CYS) – Cheyenne Regional Airport (Jerry Olson Field) – Cheyenne, Wyoming
 KCYW – Clay Center Municipal Airport – Clay Center, Kansas
 KCZD – Cozad Municipal Airport – Cozad, Nebraska
 KCZG (CZG) – Tri-Cities Airport – Endicott, New York
 KCZK (CZK) – Cascade Locks State Airport – Cascade Locks, Oregon
 KCZL – Tom B. David Field – Calhoun, Georgia
 KCZT – Dimmit County Airport – Carrizo Springs, Texas

KD 

 KDAA (DAA) – Davison Army Airfield – Fort Belvoir, Virginia
 KDAB (DAB) – Daytona Beach International Airport – Daytona Beach, Florida
 KDAF – Necedah Airport – Necedah, Wisconsin
 KDAG – Barstow-Daggett Airport – Daggett, California
 KDAL (DAL) – Dallas Love Field – Dallas, Texas
 KDAN (DAN) – Danville Regional Airport – Danville, Virginia
 KDAW – Skyhaven Airport – Rochester, New Hampshire
 KDAY (DAY) – James M. Cox International Airport – Dayton, Ohio
 KDBN – W. H. 'Bud' Barron Airport – Dublin, Georgia
 KDBQ (DBQ) – Dubuque Regional Airport – Dubuque, Iowa
 KDCA (DCA) – Ronald Reagan Washington National Airport – Arlington County, Virginia (near Washington, D.C.)
 KDCU – Pryor Field Regional Airport – Decatur, Alabama
 KDCY – Daviess County Airport – Washington, Indiana
 KDDC (DDC) – Dodge City Regional Airport – Dodge City, Kansas
 KDDH – William H. Morse State Airport – Bennington, Vermont
 KDEC (DEC) – Decatur Airport – Decatur, Illinois
 KDED – DeLand Municipal Airport (Sidney H. Taylor Field) – DeLand, Florida
 KDEH – Decorah Municipal Airport – Decorah, Iowa
 KDEN (DEN) – Denver International Airport (replaced Stapleton Int'l) – Denver, Colorado
 KDEQ (DEQ) – J. Lynn Helms Sevier County Airport – De Queen, Arkansas
 KDET (DET) – Coleman A. Young International Airport – Detroit, Michigan
 KDEW – Deer Park Airport – Deer Park, Washington
 KDFI – Defiance Memorial Airport – Defiance, Ohio
 KDFW (DFW) – Dallas/Fort Worth International Airport – Dallas / Fort Worth, Texas
 KDGL (DGL) – Douglas Municipal Airport – Douglas, Arizona
 KDGW (DGW) – Converse County Airport – Douglas, Wyoming
 KDHN (DHN) – Dothan Regional Airport – Dothan, Alabama
 KDHT – Dalhart Municipal Airport – Dalhart, Texas
 KDIJ - Driggs-Reed Memorial Airport - Driggs, Idaho
 KDIK (DIK) – Dickinson – Theodore Roosevelt Regional Airport – Dickinson, North Dakota
 KDKB – DeKalb Taylor Municipal Airport – DeKalb, Illinois
 KDKK – Chautauqua County/Dunkirk Airport – Dunkirk, New York
 KDKR (DKR) – Houston County Airport – Crockett, Texas
 KDKX – Knoxville Downtown Island Airport – Knoxville, Tennessee
 KDLC – Dillon County Airport – Dillon, South Carolina
 KDLF (DLF) – Laughlin Air Force Base – Del Rio, Texas
 KDLH (DLH) – Duluth International Airport – Duluth, Minnesota
 KDLL – Baraboo-Wisconsin Dells Airport – Baraboo, Wisconsin
 KDLN – Dillon Airport – Dillon, Montana
 KDLO – Delano Municipal Airport – Delano, California
 KDLS (DLS) – Columbia Gorge Regional Airport (The Dalles Municipal Airport) – The Dalles, Oregon
 KDLZ (DLZ) – Delaware Municipal Airport – Delaware, Ohio
 KDMA (DMA) – Davis-Monthan Air Force Base – Tucson, Arizona
 KDMN (DMN) – Deming Municipal Airport – Deming, New Mexico
 KDMO (DMO) – Sedalia Regional Airport – Sedalia, Missouri
 KDMW – Carroll County Regional Airport (Jack B. Poage Field) – Westminster, Maryland
 KDNA –Doña Ana County International Jetport – Santa Teresa, New Mexico 
 KDNL – Daniel Field – Augusta, Georgia
 KDNN – Dalton Municipal Airport – Dalton, Georgia
 KDNS – Denison Municipal Airport – Denison, Iowa
 KDNV (DNV) – Vermilion Regional Airport – Danville, Illinois
 KDOV (DOV) – Dover Air Force Base – Dover, Delaware
 KDPA – Dupage Airport – West Chicago, Illinois
 KDPG – Michael Army Airfield – Dugway Proving Ground, Utah
 KDPL – Duplin County Airport – Kenansville, North Carolina
 KDQH – Douglas Municipal Airport – Douglas, Georgia
 KDRA – Desert Rock Airport – Mercury, Nevada
 KDRI (DRI) – Beauregard Regional Airport – De Ridder, Louisiana
 KDRO – Durango-La Plata County Airport – Durango, Colorado
 KDRT – Del Rio International Airport – Del Rio, Texas
 KDRU – Drummond Airport – Drummond, Montana
 KDSM (DSM) – Des Moines International Airport – Des Moines, Iowa
 KDSV – Dansville Municipal Airport – Dansville, New York
 KDTA – Delta Municipal Airport – Delta, Utah
 KDTG – Dwight Airport – Dwight, Illinois
 KDTL (DTL) – Detroit Lakes Airport (Wething Field) – Detroit Lakes, Minnesota
 KDTN (DTN) – Shreveport Downtown Airport – Shreveport, Louisiana
 KDTO – Denton Enterprise Airport – Denton, Texas
 KDTS – Destin Executive Airport – Destin, Florida
 KDTW (DTW) – Detroit Metropolitan Wayne County Airport – Romulus, Michigan (near Detroit)
 KDUA (DUA) – Durant Regional Airport-Eaker Field – Durant, Oklahoma
 KDUC – Halliburton Field (Duncan Municipal Airport) – Duncan, Oklahoma
 KDUG – Bisbee-Douglas International Airport – Bisbee / Douglas, Arizona
 KDUH – Toledo Suburban Airport – Lambertville, Michigan
 KDUJ (DUJ) – DuBois Regional Airport (formerly DuBois-Jefferson County Airport) – DuBois, Pennsylvania
 KDUX (DUX) – Moore County Airport – Dumas, Texas
 KDVK – Stuart Powell Field – Danville, Kentucky
 KDVL (DVL) – Devils Lake Regional Airport (Devils Lake Municipal Airport) – Devils Lake, North Dakota
 KDVN – Davenport Municipal Airport – Davenport, Iowa
 KDVO – Gnoss Field (Marin County Airport) – Novato, California
 KDVP – Slayton Municipal Airport – Slayton, Minnesota
 KDVT – Phoenix Deer Valley Airport – Phoenix, Arizona
 KDWH – David Wayne Hooks Memorial Airport – Spring, Texas
 KDWU – Ashland Regional Airport – Ashland, Kentucky
 KDXE – Dexter Municipal Airport – Dexter, Missouri
 KDXR – Danbury Municipal Airport – Danbury, Connecticut
 KDXX – Lac qui Parle County Airport – Madison, Minnesota
 KDYA (DYA) – Demopolis Municipal Airport (Julian D. "Buzz" Sawyer Airport) – Demopolis, Alabama
 KDYB (DYB) – Summerville Airport – Summerville, South Carolina
 KDYL – Doylestown Airport – Doylestown, Pennsylvania
 KDYR – Dyersburg Regional Airport – Dyersburg, Tennessee
 KDYS (DYS) – Dyess Air Force Base – Abilene, Texas
 KDYT – Sky Harbor Airport & Seaplane Base – Duluth, Minnesota
 KDZJ (DZJ) – Blairsville Airport – Blairsville, Georgia

KE 

 KEAG – Eagle Grove Municipal Airport – Eagle Grove, Iowa
 KEAN (EAN) – Phifer Airfield – Wheatland, Wyoming
 KEAR (EAR) – Kearney Regional Airport – Kearney, Nebraska
 KEAT – Pangborn Memorial Airport – Wenatchee, Washington
 KEAU (EAU) – Chippewa Valley Regional Airport – Eau Claire, Wisconsin
 KEBG (EBG) – South Texas International Airport at Edinburg (Edinburg International Airport)  – Edinburg, Texas
 KEBS – Webster City Municipal Airport – Webster City, Iowa
 KECG (ECG) – Elizabeth City Regional Airport / Elizabeth City CGAS (Elizabeth City-Pasquotank County Regional Airport) – Elizabeth City, North Carolina
 KECP (ECP) – Northwest Florida Beaches International Airport – Panama City, Florida
 KECS (ECS) – Mondell Field – Newcastle, Wyoming
 KECU – Edwards County Airport – Rocksprings, Texas
 KEDC – Austin Executive Airport (Bird's Nest Airport)  – Austin, Texas
 KEDE (EDE) – Northeastern Regional Airport – Edenton, North Carolina
 KEDG – Weide Army Heliport – Edgewood Arsenal, Aberdeen Proving Ground, Maryland
 KEDJ (EDJ) – Bellefontaine Regional Airport – Bellefontaine, Ohio
 KEDN – Enterprise Municipal Airport – Enterprise, Alabama
 KEDU - University Airport - Davis, California
 KEDW (EDW) – Edwards Air Force Base – Rosamond, California
 KEED – Needles Airport – Needles, California
 KEEN (EEN) – Dillant-Hopkins Airport – Keene, New Hampshire
 KEEO – Meeker Airport – Meeker, Colorado
 KEET – Shelby County Airport – Alabaster, Alabama
 KEFC – Belle Fourche Municipal Airport – Belle Fourche, South Dakota
 KEFD – Ellington Field Joint Reserve Base – Houston, Texas
 KEFK – Northeast Kingdom International Airport – Newport, Vermont
 KEFT – Monroe Municipal Airport – Monroe, Wisconsin
 KEFW – Jefferson Municipal Airport – Jefferson, Iowa
 KEGE (EGE) – Eagle County Regional Airport – Eagle, Colorado (near Vail)
 KEGI – Duke Field (Eglin Auxiliary Field 3) – Crestview, Florida
 KEGQ – Emmetsburg Municipal Airport – Emmetsburg, Iowa
 KEGT – Wellington Municipal Airport – Wellington, Kansas
 KEGV – Eagle River Union Airport – Eagle River, Wisconsin
 KEHA – Elkhart-Morton County Airport – Elkhart, Kansas
 KEHO (EHO) – Shelby-Cleveland County Regional Airport – Shelby, North Carolina
 KEHR – Henderson City-County Airport – Henderson, Kentucky
 KEIK – Erie Municipal Airport – Erie, Colorado
 KEIW – County Memorial Airport – New Madrid, Missouri
 KEKA (EKA) – Murray Field – Eureka, California
 KEKM – Elkhart Municipal Airport – Elkhart, Indiana
 KEKN (EKN) – Elkins-Randolph County Airport (Jennings Randolph Field) – Elkins, West Virginia
 KEKO (EKO) – Elko Regional Airport – Elko, Nevada
 KEKQ – Wayne County Airport – Monticello, Kentucky
 KEKS (EKS) – Ennis - Big Sky Airport – Ennis, Montana,  
 KEKX – Elizabethtown Regional Airport (Addington Field) – Elizabethtown, Kentucky
 KEKY – Bessemer Airport – Bessemer, Alabama
 KELA – Eagle Lake Airport – Eagle Lake, Texas
 KELD (ELD) – South Arkansas Regional Airport at Goodwin Field – El Dorado, Arkansas
 KELK (ELK) – Elk City Regional Business Airport – Elk City, Oklahoma
 KELM (ELM) – Elmira/Corning Regional Airport – Big Flats, New York (near Elmira & Corning)
 KELN – Bowers Field – Ellensburg, Washington
 KELO (ELO) – Ely Municipal Airport – Ely, Minnesota
 KELP (ELP) – El Paso International Airport – El Paso, Texas
 KELY – Ely Airport (Yelland Field) – Ely, Nevada
 KELZ – Wellsville Municipal Airport (Tarantine Field) – Wellsville, New York
 KEMM (EMM) – Kemmerer Municipal Airport – Kemmerer, Wyoming
 KEMP – Emporia Municipal Airport – Emporia, Kansas
 KEMT – San Gabriel Valley Airport – El Monte, California
 KEMV – Emporia-Greensville Regional Airport – Emporia, Virginia
 KEND (END) – Vance Air Force Base – Enid, Oklahoma
 KENL – Centralia Municipal Airport – Centralia, Illinois
 KENV – Wendover Airport – Wendover, Utah
 KENW (ENW) – Kenosha Regional Airport – Kenosha, Wisconsin
 KEOE – Newberry County Airport – Newberry, South Carolina
 KEOK – Keokuk Municipal Airport – Keokuk, Iowa
 KEOP – Pike County Airport – Waverly, Ohio
 KEOS – Neosho Hugh Robinson Airport – Neosho, Missouri
 KEPG – Browns Airport – Weeping Water, Nebraska
 KEPH – Ephrata Municipal Airport – Ephrata, Washington
 KEPM – Eastport Municipal Airport – Eastport, Maine
 KEQA – El_Dorado/Captain Jack Thomas Memorial Airport – El Dorado, Kansas
 KEQY (EQY) – Monroe Regional Airport – Monroe, North Carolina
 KERI (ERI) – Erie International Airport (Tom Ridge Field) – Erie, Pennsylvania
 KERR – Errol Airport – Errol, New Hampshire
 KERV – Kerrville Municipal Airport (Louis Schreiner Field) – Kerrville, Texas
 KERY (ERY) – Luce County Airport – Newberry, Michigan
 KESC – Delta County Airport – Escanaba, Michigan
 KESF (ESF) – Esler Regional Airport – Alexandria, Louisiana
 KESN (ESN) – Easton Airport (Newnan Field) – Easton, Maryland
 KEST – Estherville Municipal Airport – Estherville, Iowa
 KESW – Easton State Airport – Easton, Washington
 KETB – West Bend Municipal Airport – West Bend, Wisconsin
 KETC – Tarboro-Edgecombe Airport – Tarboro, North Carolina
 KETN – Eastland Municipal Airport – Eastland, Texas
 KEUF (EUF) – Weedon Field – Eufaula, Alabama
 KEUG (EUG) – Eugene Airport / Mahlon Sweet Field – Eugene, Oregon
 KEUL – Caldwell Industrial Airport – Caldwell, Idaho
 KEVB – New Smyrna Beach Municipal Airport (Jack Bolt Field) – New Smyrna Beach, Florida
 KEVM – Eveleth-Virginia Municipal Airport – Eveleth, Minnesota
 KEVU (EVU) – Northwest Missouri Regional Airport – Maryville, Missouri
 KEVV (EVV) – Evansville Regional Airport – Evansville, Indiana
 KEVW (EVW) – Evanston-Uinta County Airport (Burns Field) – Evanston, Wyoming
 KEVY – Summit Airport – Middletown, Delaware
 KEWB (EWB) – New Bedford Regional Airport – New Bedford, Massachusetts
 KEWK – Newton City/County Airport – Newton, Kansas
 KEWN (EWN) – Coastal Carolina Regional Airport – New Bern, North Carolina
 KEWR (EWR) – Newark Liberty International Airport – Newark & Elizabeth, New Jersey
 KEXX (EXX) – Davidson County Airport – Lexington, North Carolina
 KEYE (EYE) – Eagle Creek Airpark – Indianapolis, Indiana
 KEYF – Curtis L. Brown Jr. Field – Elizabethtown, North Carolina
 KEYQ – Weiser Air Park – Houston, Texas
 KEYW (EYW) – Key West International Airport – Key West, Florida
 KEZF – Shannon Airport – Fredericksburg, Virginia
 KEZI – Kewanee Municipal Airport – Kewanee, Illinois
 KEZM – Heart of Georgia Regional Airport – Eastman, Georgia
 KEZS (EZS) – Shawano Municipal Airport – Shawano, Wisconsin
 KEZZ – Cameron Memorial Airport – Cameron, Missouri

KF 

 KFAF – Joint Base Langley-Eustis (formerly Felker Army Airfield) – Fort Eustis, Virginia
 KFAM – Farmington Regional Airport – Farmington, Missouri
 KFAR (FAR) – Hector International Airport – Fargo, North Dakota
 KFAT (FAT) – Fresno Yosemite International Airport – Fresno, California
 KFAY (FAY) – Fayetteville Regional Airport (Grannis Field) – Fayetteville, North Carolina
 KFBG (FBG) – Simmons Army Airfield – Fort Bragg, North Carolina
 KFBL – Faribault Municipal Airport – Faribault, Minnesota
 KFBR (FBR) – Fort Bridger Airport – Fort Bridger, Wyoming
 KFBY – Fairbury Municipal Airport – Fairbury, Nebraska
 KFCA/KGPI (FCA) – Glacier Park International Airport – Kalispell, Montana
 KFCH – Fresno Chandler Executive Airport – Fresno, California
 KFCI – Chesterfield County Airport – Richmond, Virginia
 KFCM – Flying Cloud Airport – Eden Prairie, Minnesota
 KFCS – Butts Army Airfield (Fort Carson) – Fort Carson, Colorado
 KFCT – Vagabond Army Heliport – Yakima, Washington
 KFCY – Forrest City Municipal Airport – Forrest City, Arkansas
 KFDK – Frederick Municipal Airport – Frederick, Maryland
 KFDR (FDR) – Frederick Regional Airport – Frederick, Oklahoma
 KFDW – Fairfield County Airport – Winnsboro, South Carolina
 KFDY – Findlay Airport – Findlay, Ohio
 KFEP – Albertus Airport – Freeport, Illinois
 KFES – Festus Memorial Airport – Festus, Missouri
 KFET – Fremont Municipal Airport – Fremont, Nebraska
 KFFA – First Flight Airport – Kill Devil Hills, North Carolina
 KFFC – Atlanta Regional Airport (Falcon Field) – Peachtree City, Georgia
 KFFL – Fairfield Municipal Airport – Fairfield, Iowa
 KFFM – Fergus Falls Municipal Airport (Einar Mickelson Field) – Fergus Falls, Minnesota
 KFFO (FFO) – Wright-Patterson Air Force Base – Dayton, Ohio
 KFFT – Capital City Airport – Frankfort, Kentucky
 KFFZ (FFZ) – Falcon Field – Mesa, Arizona
 KFGU – Collegedale Municipal Airport – Collegedale, Tennessee
 KFGX – Fleming-Mason Airport – Flemingsburg, Kentucky
 KFHB – Fernandina Beach Municipal Airport – Fernandina Beach, Florida
 KFHR (FRD) – Friday Harbor Airport – Friday Harbor, Washington
 KFHU (FHU) – Sierra Vista Municipal Airport / Libby Army Airfield – Fort Huachuca / Sierra Vista, Arizona
 KFIG – Clearfield-Lawrence Airport – Clearfield, Pennsylvania
 KFIT (FIT) – Fitchburg Municipal Airport – Fitchburg, Massachusetts
 KFKA – Fillmore County Airport – Preston, Minnesota
 KFKL (FKL) – Venango Regional Airport – Franklin, Pennsylvania
 KFKN – Franklin Municipal-John Beverly Rose Airport – Franklin, Virginia
 KFKR – Frankfort Municipal Airport – Frankfort, Indiana
 KFKS – Frankfort Dow Memorial Field – Frankfort, Michigan
 KFLD – Fond du Lac County Airport – Fond du Lac, Wisconsin
 KFLG (FLG) – Flagstaff Pulliam Airport – Flagstaff, Arizona
 KFLL (FLL) – Fort Lauderdale-Hollywood International Airport – Fort Lauderdale / Hollywood, Florida
 KFLO (FLO) – Florence Regional Airport – Florence, South Carolina
 KFLP – Marion County Regional Airport – Flippin, Arkansas
 KFLV (FLV) – Sherman Army Airfield – Fort Leavenworth, Kansas
 KFLX – Fallon Municipal Airport – Fallon, Nevada
 KFLY – Meadow Lake Airport – Colorado Springs, Colorado
 KFME (FME) – Tipton Airport – Fort Meade / Odenton, Maryland
 KFMH – Otis Air National Guard Base – Falmouth, Massachusetts
 KFMM – Fort Morgan Municipal Airport – Fort Morgan, Colorado
 KFMN – Four Corners Regional Airport – Farmington, New Mexico
 KFMY (FMY) – Page Field – Fort Myers, Florida
 KFMZ – Fairmont State Airfield – Fairmont, Nebraska
 KFNB – Brenner Field – Falls City, Nebraska
 KFNL – Fort Collins-Loveland Municipal Airport – Fort Collins / Loveland, Colorado
 KFNT (FNT) – Bishop International Airport – Flint, Michigan
 KFOA – Flora Municipal Airport – Flora, Illinois
 KFOD (FOD) – Fort Dodge Regional Airport – Fort Dodge, Iowa
 KFOE (FOE) – Topeka Regional Airport – Topeka, Kansas
 KFOK (FOK) – Francis S. Gabreski Airport – Westhampton Beach, New York
 KFOM – Fillmore Municipal Airport – Fillmore, Utah
 KFOT – Rohnerville Airport – Fortuna, California
 KFOZ – Bigfork Municipal Airport – Bigfork, Minnesota
 KFPK (FPK) – Fitch H. Beach Airport – Charlotte, Michigan
 KFPR (FPR) – Treasure Coast International Airport – Fort Pierce, Florida
 KFQD – Rutherford County Airport (Marchman Field) – Rutherfordton, North Carolina
 KFRG (FRG) – Republic Airport – East Farmingdale, New York
 KFRH – French Lick Municipal Airport – French Lick, Indiana
 KFRI (FRI) – Marshall Army Airfield – Fort Riley / Junction City, Kansas
 KFRM – Fairmont Municipal Airport – Fairmont, Minnesota
 KFRR – Front Royal-Warren County Airport – Front Royal, Virginia
 KFSD (FSD) – Sioux Falls Regional Airport (Joe Foss Field) – Sioux Falls, South Dakota
 KFSE – Fosston Municipal Airport – Fosston, Minnesota
 KFSI (FSI) – Henry Post Army Airfield – Fort Sill / Lawton, Oklahoma
 KFSK – Fort Scott Municipal Airport – Fort Scott, Kansas
 KFSM (FSM) – Fort Smith Regional Airport – Fort Smith, Arkansas
 KFSO – Franklin County State Airport – Highgate, Vermont
 KFST – Fort Stockton-Pecos County Airport – Fort Stockton, Texas
 KFSU – Fort Sumner Municipal Airport – Fort Sumner, New Mexico
 KFSW – Fort Madison Municipal Airport – Fort Madison, Iowa
 KFTG – Front Range Airport – Aurora, Colorado
 KFTK (FTK) – Godman Army Airfield – Fort Knox, Kentucky
 KFTT – Elton Hensley Memorial Airport – Fulton, Missouri
 KFTW (FTW) – Fort Worth Meacham International Airport – Fort Worth, Texas
 KFTY (FTY) – Fulton County Airport (Charlie Brown Field) – Atlanta, Georgia
 KFUL – Fullerton Municipal Airport – Fullerton, California
 KFVE (FVE) – Northern Aroostook Regional Airport – Frenchville, Maine
 KFVX – Farmville Regional Airport – Farmville, Virginia
 KFWA (FWA) – Fort Wayne International Airport – Fort Wayne, Indiana
 KFWC – Fairfield Municipal Airport – Fairfield, Illinois
 KFWN – Sussex Airport – Sussex, New Jersey
 KFWQ (FWQ) – Rostraver Airport – Monongahela, Pennsylvania
 KFWS – Fort Worth Spinks Airport – Fort Worth, Texas
 KFXE – Fort Lauderdale Executive Airport – Fort Lauderdale, Florida
 KFXY – Forest City Municipal Airport – Forest City, Iowa
 KFYE – Fayette County Airport – Somerville, Tennessee
 KFYJ (FYJ) – Middle Peninsula Regional Airport – West Point, Virginia
 KFYM – Fayetteville Municipal Airport – Fayetteville, Tennessee
 KFYV (FYV) – Drake Field (Fayetteville Executive Airport) – Fayetteville, Arkansas
 KFZG – Fitzgerald Municipal Airport – Fitzgerald, Georgia
 KFZI – Fostoria Metropolitan Airport – Fostoria, Ohio
 KFZY – Oswego County Airport – Fulton, New York

KG 

 KGAB – Gabbs Airport – Gabbs, Nevada
 KGAD – Northeast Alabama Regional Airport – Gadsden, Alabama
 KGAF (GAF) – Grafton Municipal Airport – Grafton, North Dakota
 KGAG - Gage Airport - Gage, Oklahoma
 KGAI – Montgomery County Airpark – Gaithersburg, Maryland
 KGAO – South Lafourche Leonard Miller Jr. Airport – Lafourche Parish, Louisiana
 KGBD – Great Bend Municipal Airport – Great Bend, Kansas
 KGBR – Walter J. Koladza Airport (Great Barrington Airport) – Great Barrington, Massachusetts
 KGCC (GCC) – Gillette-Campbell County Airport – Gillette, Wyoming
 KGCD - Seneca Emergency Airstrip - Seneca, Oregon
 KGCK (GCK) – Garden City Regional Airport – Garden City, Kansas
 KGCM - Claremore Regional Airport - Claremore, Oklahoma
 KGCN (GCN) – Grand Canyon National Park Airport – Grand Canyon National Park, Arizona
 KGDJ (GDJ) – Granbury Regional Airport – Granbury, Texas
 KGDM (GDM) – Gardner Municipal Airport – Gardner, Massachusetts
 KGDP - Dell City Municipal Airport - Dell City, Texas
 KGDV – Dawson Community Airport – Glendive, Montana
 KGDY – Grundy Municipal Airport – Grundy, Virginia
 KGED – Delaware Coastal Airport (Georgetown Airport) – Georgetown, Delaware
 KGEG (GEG) – Spokane International Airport – Spokane, Washington
 KGEU – Glendale Municipal Airport – Glendale, Arizona
 KGEV – Ashe County Airport – Jefferson, North Carolina
 KGEY (GEY) – South Big Horn County Airport – Greybull, Wyoming
 KGFA (GFA) – Malmstrom Air Force Base – Great Falls, Montana
 KGFK (GFK) – Grand Forks International Airport – Grand Forks, North Dakota
 KGFL (GFL) – Floyd Bennett Memorial Airport – Glens Falls, New York
 KGGE – Georgetown County Airport – Georgetown, South Carolina
 KGGF – Grant Municipal Airport – Grant, Nebraska
 KGGG (GGG) – East Texas Regional Airport – Longview, Texas
 KGGI – Grinnell Regional Airport (Billy Robinson Field) – Grinnell, Iowa
 KGGW (GGW) – Glasgow Airport – Glasgow, Montana
 KGHG (GHG) – Marshfield Municipal Airport (George Harlow Field) – Marshfield, Massachusetts
 KGHM – Centerville Municipal Airport – Centerville, Tennessee
 KGIC - Idaho County Airport - Grangeville, Idaho
 KGIF – Winter Haven's Gilbert Airport (Gilbert Field) – Winter Haven, Florida
 KGJT (GJT) – Grand Junction Regional Airport (Walker Field) – Grand Junction, Colorado
 KGKJ – Port Meadville Airport – Meadville, Pennsylvania
 KGKT (GKT) – Gatlinburg-Pigeon Forge Airport – Sevier County, Tennessee
 KGKY – Arlington Municipal Airport – Arlington, Texas
 KGLD – Goodland Municipal Airport (Renner Field) – Goodland, Kansas
 KGLH (GLH) – Mid Delta Regional Airport – Greenville, Mississippi
 KGLS (GLS) – Scholes International Airport at Galveston – Galveston, Texas
 KGLW – Glasgow Municipal Airport – Glasgow, Kentucky
 KGMJ - Grove Municipal Airport - Grove, Oklahoma
 KGMU – Greenville Downtown Airport – Greenville, South Carolina
 KGNB – Granby-Grand County Airport – Granby, Colorado
 KGNC - Gaines County Airport - Seminole, Texas
 KGNF – Grenada Municipal Airport – Grenada, Mississippi
 KGNG – Gooding Municipal Airport – Gooding, Idaho
 KGNI – Grand Isle Seaplane Base – Grand Isle, Louisiana
 KGNT – Grants-Milan Municipal Airport – Grants, New Mexico
 KGNV (GNV) – Gainesville Regional Airport – Gainesville, Florida
 KGOK - Guthrie-Edmond Regional Airport - Guthrie, Oklahoma
 KGON (GON) – Groton-New London Airport – Groton / New London, Connecticut
 KGOO – Nevada County Air Park (Nevada County Airport) – Grass Valley, California
 KGOV – Grayling Army Airfield – Grayling, Michigan
 KGPI - See KFCA
 KGPT (GPT) – Gulfport-Biloxi International Airport – Gulfport, Mississippi
 KGPZ (GPZ) – Grand Rapids-Itasca County Airport – Grand Rapids, Minnesota
 KGRB (GRB) – Austin Straubel International Airport – Green Bay, Wisconsin
 KGRD – Greenwood County Airport – Greenwood, South Carolina
 KGRF (GRF) – Gray Army Airfield – Fort Lewis, Washington
 KGRI (GRI) – Central Nebraska Regional Airport – Grand Island, Nebraska
 KGRK (GRK) – Killeen-Fort Hood Regional Airport / Gray Army Airfield – Fort Hood, Killeen, Texas
 KGRN – Gordon Municipal Airport – Gordon, Nebraska
 KGRR (GRR) – Gerald R. Ford International Airport – Grand Rapids, Michigan
 KGSB (GSB) – Seymour Johnson Air Force Base – Goldsboro, North Carolina
 KGSO (GSO) – Piedmont Triad International Airport – Greensboro, North Carolina
 KGSP (GSP) – Greenville-Spartanburg International Airport – Greer, South Carolina
 KGSW – Greater Southwest International Airport – Fort Worth, Texas (closed 1970s)
 KGTB (GTB) – Wheeler-Sack Army Airfield – Fort Drum, New York
 KGTE – Gothenburg Municipal Airport – Gothenburg, Nebraska
 KGTF (GTF) – Great Falls International Airport – Great Falls, Montana
 KGTG – Grantsburg Municipal Airport – Grantsburg, Wisconsin
 KGTR – Golden Triangle Regional Airport – Columbus, Mississippi
 KGTU – Georgetown Municipal Airport – Georgetown, Texas
 KGUC (GUC) – Gunnison-Crested Butte Regional Airport – Gunnison, Colorado
 KGUP (GUP) – Gallup Municipal Airport – Gallup, New Mexico
 KGUS (GUS) – Grissom Air Reserve Base – Peru, Indiana
 KGUY - Guymon Municipal Airport - Guymon, Oklahoma
 KGVE – Gordonsville Municipal Airport – Gordonsville, Virginia
 KGVQ – Genesee County Airport – Batavia, New York
 KGVT – Majors Airport – Greenville, Texas
 KGWB – DeKalb County Airport – Auburn, Indiana
 KGWO (GWO) – Greenwood-Leflore Airport – Greenwood, Mississippi
 KGWR – Gwinner-Roger Melroe Field (Gwinner Municipal Airfield) – Gwinner, North Dakota
 KGWS – Glenwood Springs Municipal Airport – Glenwood Springs, Colorado
 KGWW (GWW) – Goldsboro-Wayne Municipal Airport – Goldsboro, North Carolina
 KGXA - Gray Butte Field - Lake Los Angeles, California
 KGXF – Gila Bend Air Force Auxiliary Field – Gila Bend, Arizona
 KGXY – Greeley-Weld County Airport – Greeley, Colorado
 KGYB – Giddings-Lee County Airport – Giddings, Texas
 KGYH – Donaldson Center Airport – Greenville, South Carolina
 KGYI (GYI) – North Texas Regional Airport (Perrin Field) – Denison, Texas
 KGYR – Phoenix Goodyear Airport – Goodyear, Arizona
 KGYY (GYY) – Gary/Chicago International Airport – Gary, Indiana
 KGZH – Middleton Field – Evergreen, Alabama
 KGZL - Stigler Regional Airport - Stigler, Oklahoma

KH 
 KHAB – Marion County – Rankin Fite Airport – Hamilton, Alabama
 KHAE (HAE) – Hannibal Regional Airport (William P. Lear Field) – Hannibal, Missouri
 KHAF – Eddie Andreini Sr. Airfield (Half Moon Bay Airport) – Half Moon Bay, California
 KHAI (HAI) – Three Rivers Municipal/Doctor Haines Airport – Three Rivers, Michigan
 KHAO (HAO) – Butler County Regional Airport (Hogan Field) – Hamilton, Ohio
 KHAR – Harford Airport – Casper, Wyoming
 KHBC – Mohall Municipal Airport – Mohall, North Dakota
 KHBG – Hattiesburg Bobby L. Chain Municipal Airport – Hattiesburg, Mississippi
 KHBI – Asheboro Regional Airport – Asheboro, North Carolina
 KHBR - Hobart Regional Airport - Hobart, Oklahoma
 KHCR - Russ McDonald Field - Heber City, Utah
 KHBZ – Heber Springs Municipal Airport – Heber Springs, Arkansas
 KHCD – Hutchinson Municipal Airport (Butler Field) – Hutchinson, Minnesota
 KHDE – Brewster Field – Holdrege, Nebraska
 KHDN (HDN) – Yampa Valley Airport – Hayden, Colorado
 KHDO (HDO) – South Texas Regional Airport at Hondo – Hondo, Texas
 KHEE – Thompson-Robbins Airport – Helena, Arkansas
 KHEF – Manassas Regional Airport (Harry P. Davis Field) – Manassas, Virginia
 KHEG – Herlong Recreational Airport – Jacksonville, Florida
 KHEI – Hettinger Municipal Airport – Hettinger, North Dakota
 KHEQ – Holyoke Airport – Holyoke, Colorado
 KHEY (HEY) – Hanchey Army Heliport – Fort Rucker / Ozark, Alabama
 KHEZ – Natchez-Adams County Airport (Hardy-Anders Field) – Natchez, Mississippi
 KHFD (HFD) – Hartford-Brainard Airport – Hartford, Connecticut
 KHFF – Mackall Army Airfield – Camp Mackall, North Carolina
 KHFJ – Monett Municipal Airport – Monett, Missouri
 KHGR (HGR) – Hagerstown Regional Airport – Hagerstown, Maryland
 KHHF - Hemphill County Airport - Canadian, Texas
 KHHR (HHR) – Hawthorne Municipal Airport (Jack Northrop Field) – Hawthorne, California
 KHHW - Stan Stamper Municipal Airport - Hugo, Oklahoma
 KHIB (HIB) – Range Regional Airport – Hibbing, Minnesota
 KHIE – Mount Washington Regional Airport – Whitefield, New Hampshire
 KHIF (HIF) – Hill Air Force Base – Ogden, Utah
 KHII – Lake Havasu City Airport – Lake Havasu City, Arizona
 KHIO – Hillsboro Airport – Portland, Oregon
 KHJH – Hebron Municipal Airport – Hebron, Nebraska
 KHJO (HJO) – Hanford Municipal Airport – Hanford, California
 KHKA – Blytheville Municipal Airport – Blytheville, Arkansas
 KHKS – Hawkins Field – Jackson, Mississippi
 KHKY (HKY) – Hickory Regional Airport – Hickory, North Carolina
 KHLC – Hill City Municipal Airport – Hill City, Kansas
 KHLG – Wheeling-Ohio County Airport – Wheeling, West Virginia
 KHLN (HLN) – Helena Regional Airport – Helena, Montana
 KHLR (HLR) – Hood Army Airfield – Fort Hood / Killeen, Texas
 KHLX – Twin County Airport – Galax-Hillsville, Virginia
 KHMN (HMN) – Holloman Air Force Base – Alamogordo, New Mexico
 KHMS - Richland Airport - Richland, Washington
 KHMT – Hemet-Ryan Airport – Hemet, California
 KHMZ – Bedford County Airport – Bedford, Pennsylvania
 KHND (HSH) – Henderson Executive Airport – Henderson, Nevada
 KHNZ – Henderson-Oxford Airport – Oxford, North Carolina
 KHOB (HOB) – Lea County Regional Airport – Hobbs, New Mexico
 KHOE – Homerville Airport – Homerville, Georgia
 KHON (HON) – Huron Regional Airport – Huron, South Dakota
 KHOP (HOP) – Campbell Army Airfield – Fort Campbell, Kentucky
 KHOT (HOT) – Memorial Field Airport – Hot Springs, Arkansas
 KHOU (HOU) – William P. Hobby Airport – Houston, Texas
 KHPN (HPN) – Westchester County Airport – White Plains, New York
 KHQG – Hugoton Municipal Airport – Hugoton, Kansas
 KHQM (HQM) – Bowerman Airport – Hoquiam, Washington
 KHQU – Thomson-McDuffie County Airport – Thomson, Georgia
 KHQZ (HQZ) – Mesquite Metro Airport – Mesquite, Texas
 KHRI – Hermiston Municipal Airport – Hermiston, Oregon
 KHRJ (HRJ) – Harnett Regional Jetport – Erwin, North Carolina
 KHRL (HRL) – Valley International Airport – Harlingen, Texas
 KHRO (HRO) – Boone County Airport – Harrison, Arkansas
KHRT – Hurlburt Field – Okaloosa County, Florida
 KHRU (HRU) – Herington Regional Airport – Herington, Kansas
 KHRX - Hereford Municipal Airport - Hereford, Texas
 KHSA – Stennis International Airport – Bay St. Louis, Mississippi
 KHSE – Billy Mitchell Airport – Hatteras, North Carolina
 KHSI – Hastings Municipal Airport – Hastings, Nebraska
 KHSP (HSP) – Ingalls Field – Hot Springs, Virginia
 KHSR – Hot Springs Municipal Airport – Hot Springs, South Dakota
 KHST (HST) – Homestead Air Reserve Base – Homestead, Florida
 KHSV (HSV) – Huntsville International Airport (Carl T. Jones Field) – Huntsville, Alabama
 KHTH (HTH) – Hawthorne Industrial Airport – Hawthorne, Nevada
 KHTO (HTO) – East Hampton Airport – East Hampton, New York
 KHTS (HTS) – Tri-State Airport – Huntington, West Virginia
 KHUA (HUA) – Redstone Army Airfield – Redstone Arsenal / Huntsville, Alabama
 KHUF (HUF) – Terre Haute Regional Airport – Terre Haute, Indiana
 KHUL – Houlton International Airport – Houlton, Maine
 KHUM – Houma-Terrebonne Airport – Houma, Louisiana
 KHUT (HUT) – Hutchinson Municipal Airport – Hutchinson, Kansas
 KHVC – Hopkinsville-Christian County Airport – Hopkinsville, Kentucky
 KHVE – Hanksville Airport – Hanksville, Utah
 KHVN (HVN) – Tweed-New Haven Airport – New Haven, Connecticut
 KHVR – Havre City County Airport – Havre, Montana
 KHVS – Hartsville Regional Airport – Hartsville, South Carolina
 KHWD (HWD) – Hayward Executive Airport – Hayward, California
 KHWO – North Perry Airport – Hollywood, Florida
 KHWQ – Wheatland County Airport – Harlowton, Montana
 KHWV (WSH) – Brookhaven Airport – Shirley, New York
 KHWY (HWY) – Warrenton-Fauquier Airport – Warrenton, Virginia
 KHXD – Hilton Head Airport – Hilton Head Island, South Carolina
 KHXF – Hartford Municipal Airport – Hartford, Wisconsin
 KHYA (HYA) – Barnstable Municipal Airport – Hyannis, Massachusetts
 KHYI – San Marcos Regional Airport – San Marcos, Texas
 KHYR – Sawyer County Airport – Hayward, Wisconsin
 KHYS (HYS) – Hays Regional Airport – Hays, Kansas
 KHYW – Conway-Horry County Airport – Conway, South Carolina
 KHYX – Saginaw County H.W. Browne Airport – Saginaw, Michigan
 KHZE – Mercer County Regional Airport – Hazen, North Dakota
 KHZL – Hazleton Regional Airport – Hazleton, Pennsylvania

KI 

 KIAB (IAB) – McConnell Air Force Base – Wichita, Kansas
 KIAD (IAD) – Washington Dulles International Airport – Dulles, Virginia
 KIAG (IAG) – Niagara Falls International Airport – Niagara Falls, New York
 KIAH (IAH) – George Bush Intercontinental Airport – Houston, Texas
 KIBM – Kimball Municipal Airport (Robert E. Arraj Field) – Kimball, Nebraska
 KICR (ICR) – Winner Regional Airport (Bob Wiley Field) – Winner, South Dakota
 KICT (ICT) – Wichita Dwight D. Eisenhower National Airport – Wichita, Kansas
 KIDA (IDA) – Idaho Falls Regional Airport – Idaho Falls, Idaho
 KIDI – Indiana County-Jimmy Stewart Airport – Indiana, Pennsylvania
 KIDL – Indianola Municipal Airport – Indianola, Mississippi
 KIDP – Independence Municipal Airport – Independence, Kansas
 KIEN - Pine Ridge Airport - Pine Ridge, South Dakota
 KIFP (IFP) – Laughlin/Bullhead International Airport – Bullhead City, Arizona
 KIGM (IGM) – Kingman Airport – Kingman, Arizona
 KIGX – Horace Williams Airport – Chapel Hill, North Carolina
 KIIB – Independence Municipal Airport – Independence, Iowa
 KIIY – Washington-Wilkes County Airport – Washington, Georgia
 KIJD – Windham Airport – Willimantic, Connecticut
 KIJX – Jacksonville Municipal Airport  - Jacksonville, Illinois
 KIKV (IKV) – Ankeny Regional Airport – Ankeny, Iowa
 KIKW (IKW) – Jack Barstow Municipal Airport – Midland, Michigan
 KILE (ILE) – Skylark Field – Killeen, Texas
 KILG (ILG) – Wilmington Airport – Wilmington, Delaware
 KILM (ILM) – Wilmington International Airport – Wilmington, North Carolina
 KILN (ILN) – Wilmington Air Park – Wilmington, Ohio
 KIML – Imperial Municipal Airport – Imperial, Nebraska
 KIMM (IMM) – Immokalee Airport – Immokalee, Florida
 KIMS – Madison Municipal Airport – Madison, Indiana
 KIMT (IMT) – Ford Airport – Iron Mountain, Missouri
 KIND (IND) – Indianapolis International Airport – Indianapolis, Indiana
 KINJ (INJ) – Hillsboro Municipal Airport – Hillsboro, Texas
 KINK - Winkler County Airport - Kermit, Texas
 KINL (INL) - Falls International Airport - International Falls, Minnesota
 KINS – Creech Air Force Base – Indian Springs, Nevada
 KINT (INT) – Smith Reynolds Airport – Winston-Salem, North Carolina
 KINW (INW) – Winslow-Lindbergh Regional Airport – Winslow, Arizona
 KIOW – Iowa City Municipal Airport – Iowa City, Iowa
 KIPJ – Lincolnton-Lincoln County Regional Airport – Lincolnton, North Carolina
 KIPL – Imperial County Airport – Imperial, California
 KIPT (IPT) – Williamsport Regional Airport – Williamsport, Pennsylvania
 KIRK (IRK) – Kirksville Regional Airport – Kirksville, Missouri
 KISM (ISM) – Kissimmee Gateway Airport – Kissimmee, Florida
 KISN – Sloulin Field International Airport – Williston, North Dakota (closed 2019)
 KISO – Kinston Regional Jetport (Stallings Field) – Kinston, North Carolina
 KISP (ISP) – Long Island MacArthur Airport – Ronkonkoma, New York
 KISW – South Wood County Airport (Alexander Field) – Wisconsin Rapids, Wisconsin
 KITH (ITH) – Ithaca Tompkins International Airport – Ithaca, New York
 KITR – Kit Carson County Airport – Burlington, Colorado
 KIWA (AZA) – Phoenix-Mesa Gateway Airport – Mesa, Arizona
 KIWI – Wiscasset Airport – Wiscasset, Maine
 KIWD  (IWD) – Gogebic-Iron County Airport – Ironwood, Michigan
 KIXD – New Century AirCenter – Olathe, Kansas
 KIYK – Inyokern Airport – Inyokern, California
 KIZA – Santa Ynez Airport – Santa Ynez, California
 KIZG – Eastern Slopes Regional Airport (Fryeburg Airport) – Fryeburg, Maine

KJ 

 KJAC (JAC) – Jackson Hole Airport – Jackson Hole, Wyoming
 KJAN (JAN) – Jackson International Airport – Jackson, Mississippi
 KJAX (JAX) – Jacksonville International Airport – Jacksonville, Florida
 KJBR (JBR) – Jonesboro Municipal Airport – Jonesboro, Arkansas
 KJCT - Kimble County Airport - Junction, Texas
 KJDN – Jordan Airport – Jordan, Montana
 KJEF – Jefferson City Memorial Airport – Jefferson City, Missouri
 KJFK (JFK) – John F. Kennedy International Airport – New York, New York
 KJFX – Walker County Airport (Bevill Field) – Jasper, Alabama
 KJER – Jerome County Airport – Jerome, Idaho
 KJGG – Williamsburg-Jamestown Airport – Williamsburg, Virginia
 KJHN – Stanton County Municipal Airport – Johnson, Kansas
 KJHW – Chautauqua County-Jamestown Airport – Jamestown, New York
 KJKA (GUF) – Jack Edwards Airport – Gulf Shores, Alabama
 KJLN (JLN) – Joplin Regional Airport – Joplin, Missouri
 KJMS (JMS) – Jamestown Regional Airport – Jamestown, North Dakota
 KJNX – Johnston Regional Airport – Smithfield, North Carolina
 KJQF (JQF) – Concord Regional Airport – Concord, North Carolina
 KJRA – West 30th Street Heliport – Manhattan, New York City, New York
 KJRB (JRB) – Downtown Manhattan Heliport – Manhattan, New York City, New York
 KJST (JST) – Johnstown-Cambria County Airport – Johnstown, Pennsylvania
 KJSV - Sallisaw Municipal Airport - Sallisaw, Oklahoma
 KJVW – John Bell Williams Airport – Raymond, Mississippi
 KJWG - Watonga Regional Airport - Watonga, Oklahoma
 KJWN - John C. Tune Airport - Nashville, Tennessee
 KJYO (JYO) – Leesburg Executive Airport (Godfrey Field) – Leesburg, Virginia
 KJYR – York Municipal Airport – York, Nebraska
 KJZI – Charleston Executive Airport – Charleston, South Carolina
 KJZP – Pickens County Airport – Jasper, Georgia

KK 

 KKIC – Mesa Del Rey Airport – King City, California
 KKLS (KLS) – Southwest Washington Regional Airport (was Kelso-Longview) – Kelso, Washington
 KKNB (KNB) – Kanab Municipal Airport – Kanab, Utah
 KKY8 (KY8) - Hancock County Airport - Lewisport, Kentucky

KL 
 KLAA – Lamar Municipal Airport – Lamar, Colorado
 KLAF (LAF) – Purdue University Airport – West Lafayette, Indiana
 KLAL (LAL) – Lakeland Linder International Airport – Lakeland, Florida
 KLAM – Los Alamos Airport – Los Alamos, New Mexico
 KLAN (LAN) – Capital Region International Airport – Lansing, Michigan
 KLAR (LAR) – Laramie Regional Airport – Laramie, Wyoming
 KLAS (LAS) – Harry Reid International Airport – Las Vegas, Nevada
 KLAW - Lawton-Fort Sill Regional Airport - Lawton, Oklahoma
 KLAX (LAX) – Los Angeles International Airport – Los Angeles, California
 KLBB (LBB) – Lubbock Preston Smith International Airport – Lubbock, Texas
 KLBE (LBE) – Arnold Palmer Regional Airport – Latrobe, Pennsylvania
 KLBF (LBF) – North Platte Regional Airport (Lee Bird Field) – North Platte, Nebraska
 KLBL (LBL) – Liberal Municipal Airport – Liberal, Kansas
 KLBR (LBR) – Clarksville/Red River County Airport (J.D. Trissell Field) – Clarksville, Texas
 KLBT – Lumberton Municipal Airport – Lumberton, North Carolina
 KLCG – Wayne Municipal Airport (Stan Morris Field) – Wayne, Nebraska
 KLCH (LCH) – Lake Charles Regional Airport – Lake Charles, Louisiana
 KLCI – Laconia Municipal Airport – Laconia, New Hampshire
 KLCK (LCK) – Rickenbacker International Airport – Columbus, Ohio
 KLCQ – Lake City Gateway Airport – Lake City, Florida
 KLDJ – Linden Airport – Linden, New Jersey
 KLDM (LDM) – Mason County Airport – Ludington, Michigan
 KLEB (LEB) – Lebanon Municipal Airport – West Lebanon, New Hampshire
 KLEE (LEE) – Leesburg International Airport – Leesburg, Florida
 KLEM – Lemmon Municipal Airport – Lemmon, South Dakota
 KLEW – Auburn/Lewiston Municipal Airport – Auburn, Maine
 KLEX – Blue Grass Airport – Lexington, Kentucky
 KLFI – Langley Air Force Base – Hampton, Virginia
 KLFK – Angelina County Airport – Lufkin, Texas
 KLFT – Lafayette Regional Airport (Paul Fournet Field) – Lafayette, Louisiana
 KLGA – La Guardia International Airport – New York, New York
 KLGB – Long Beach Airport – Long Beach, California
 KLGD – La Grande/Union County Airport – La Grande, Oregon
 KLGF (LGF) – Laguna Army Airfield (Yuma Proving Ground) – Yuma, Arizona
 KLGU – Logan-Cache Airport – Logan, Utah
 KLHB – Hearne Municipal Airport – Hearne, Texas
 KLHM – Lincoln Regional Airport (Karl Harder Field) – Lincoln, California
 KLHQ – Fairfield County Airport – Lancaster, Ohio
 KLHV – William T. Piper Memorial Airport – Lock Haven, Pennsylvania
 KLHX – La Junta Municipal Airport – La Junta, Colorado
 KLHZ – Triangle North Executive Airport (Franklin County Airport) – Louisburg, North Carolina
 KLIC – Limon Municipal Airport – Limon, Colorado
 KLIT – Bill and Hillary Clinton National Airport (Adams Field) – Little Rock, Arkansas
 KLKP – Lake Placid Airport – Lake Placid, New York
 KLKR – Lancaster County Airport (McWhirter Field) – Lancaster, South Carolina
 KLKU – Louisa County Airport (Freeman Field) – Louisa, Virginia
 KLKV – Lake County Airport – Lakeview, Oregon
 KLLJ – Challis Airport – Challis, Idaho
 KLLQ – Monticello Municipal Airport (Ellis Field) – Monticello, Arkansas
 KLLU – Lamar Municipal Airport – Lamar, Missouri
 KLMO – Vance Brand Airport – Longmont, Colorado
 KLMS – Louisville Winston County Airport – Louisville, Mississippi
 KLMT – Crater Lake-Klamath Regional Airport – Klamath Falls, Oregon
 KLNA – Palm Beach County Park Airport (Lantana Airport) – West Palm Beach, Florida
 KLNC – Lancaster Regional Airport – Lancaster, Texas
 KLND – Hunt Field – Lander, Wyoming
 KLNK – Lincoln Airport – Lincoln, Nebraska
 KLNN – Lost Nation Airport – Willoughby, Ohio
 KLNP – Lonesome Pine Airport – Wise, Virginia
 KLNS – Lancaster Airport – Lancaster, Pennsylvania
 KLOL – Derby Field – Lovelock, Nevada
 KLOR (LOR) – Lowe Army Heliport – Fort Rucker / Ozark, Alabama
 KLOT (LOT) – Lewis University Airport – Romeoville, Illinois
 KLOU – Bowman Field – Louisville, Kentucky
 KLOZ – London-Corbin Airport (Magee Field) – London, Kentucky
 KLPC – Lompoc Airport – Lompoc, California
 KLPR – Lorain County Regional Airport – Lorain, Ohio
 KLQK – Pickens County Airport – Pickens, South Carolina
 KLQR – Larned-Pawnee County Airport – Larned, Kansas
 KLRD (LRD) – Laredo International Airport – Laredo, Texas
 KLRF – Little Rock Air Force Base – Jacksonville, Arkansas
 KLRG – Lincoln Regional Airport – Lincoln, Maine
 KLRU – Las Cruces International Airport – Las Cruces, New Mexico
 KLSB – Lordsburg Municipal Airport – Lordsburg, New Mexico
 KLSE (LSE) – La Crosse Regional Airport – La Crosse, Wisconsin
 KLSF – Lawson Army Airfield – Fort Benning, Chattahoochee County, Georgia
 KLSK – Lusk Municipal Airport – Lusk, Wyoming
 KLSN – Los Banos Municipal Airport – Los Banos, California
 KLSV (LSV) – Nellis Air Force Base – Las Vegas, Nevada
 KLTS – (LTS) Altus Air Force Base – Altus, Oklahoma
 KLTY – Liberty County Airport – Chester, Montana
 KLUF (LUF) – Luke Air Force Base – Glendale, Arizona
 KLUG – Ellington Airport – Lewisburg, Tennessee
 KLUK (LUK) - Cincinnati Municipal Lunken Airport - Cincinnati, Ohio
 KLUL – Hesler-Noble Field – Laurel, Mississippi
 KLVK – Livermore Municipal Airport – Livermore, California
 KLVL – Lawrenceville/Brunswick Municipal Airport – Lawrenceville, Virginia
 KLVM – Mission Field – Livingston, Montana
 KLVN – Airlake Airport – Lakeville, Minnesota
 KLVS (LVS) – Las Vegas Municipal Airport – Las Vegas, New Mexico
 KLWB – Greenbrier Valley Airport – Lewisburg, West Virginia
 KLWC – Lawrence Municipal Airport – Lawrence, Kansas
 KLWL – Wells Municipal Airport (Harriet Field) – Wells, Nevada
 KLWM – Lawrence Municipal Airport – Lawrence, Massachusetts
 KLWS – Lewiston-Nez Perce County Airport – Lewiston, Idaho
 KLWT – Lewistown Municipal Airport – Lewistown, Montana
 KLWV – Lawrenceville-Vincennes International Airport – Lawrenceville, Illinois
 KLXL – Little Falls/Morrison County Airport (Lindbergh Field) – Little Falls, Minnesota
 KLXN – Jim Kelly Field – Lexington, Nebraska
 KLXT – Lee's Summit Municipal Airport – Lee's Summit, Missouri
 KLXV – Lake County Airport (Leadville Airport) – Leadville, Colorado
 KLYH – Lynchburg Regional Airport – Lynchburg, Virginia
 KLYO – Lyons-Rice County Municipal Airport – Lyons, Kansas
 KLZU – Gwinnett County Airport (Briscoe Field) – Lawrenceville, Georgia
 KLZZ – Lampasas Airport – Lampasas, Texas

KM 

 KMAC (MAC) – Macon Downtown Airport (Herbert Smart Downtown Airport) – Macon, Georgia
 KMAE – Madera Municipal Airport – Madera, California
 KMAF (MAF) – Midland International Air and Space Port – Midland, Texas
 KMAI – Marianna Municipal Airport – Marianna, Florida
 KMAL – Malone-Dufort Airport – Malone, New York
 KMAN - Nampa Municipal Airport - Nampa, Idaho
 KMAO – Marion County Airport – Marion, South Carolina
 KMAW – Malden Municipal Airport – Malden, Missouri
 KMBG – Mobridge Municipal Airport – Mobridge, South Dakota
 KMBO – Campbell Airport – Madison, Mississippi
 KMBS (MBS) – MBS International Airport – Midland / Bay City / Saginaw, Michigan
 KMBT (MBT) – Murfreesboro Municipal Airport – Murfreesboro, Tennessee
 KMCB (MCB) – McComb-Pike County Airport (John E. Lewis Field) – McComb, Mississippi
 KMCC (MCC) – McClellan Airfield – Sacramento, California
 KMCE – Merced Regional Airport (MacReady Field) – Merced, California
 KMCF (MCF) – MacDill Air Force Base – Tampa, Florida
 KMCI (MCI) – Kansas City International Airport – Kansas City, Missouri
 KMCK (MCK) – McCook Ben Nelson Regional Airport – McCook, Nebraska
 KMCN (MCN) – Middle Georgia Regional Airport – Macon, Georgia
 KMCO (MCO) – Orlando International Airport – Orlando, Florida
 KMCW – Mason City Municipal Airport – Mason City, Iowa
 KMCZ – Martin County Airport – Williamston, North Carolina
 KMDD - Midland Airpark - Midland, Texas
 KMDQ – Madison County Executive Airport (Tom Sharp Jr. Field) – Huntsville, Alabama
 KMDS – Madison Municipal Airport – Madison, South Dakota
 KMDT (MDT) – Harrisburg International Airport – Middletown, Pennsylvania
 KMDW (MDW) – Chicago Midway International Airport – Chicago, Illinois
 KMDZ – Taylor County Airport – Medford, Wisconsin
 KMEB – Laurinburg-Maxton Airport – Maxton, North Carolina
 KMEI (MEI) – Meridian Regional Airport (Key Field) – Meridian, Mississippi
 KMEJ – Meade Municipal Airport – Meade, Kansas
 KMEM (MEM) – Memphis International Airport – Memphis, Tennessee
 KMER (MER) – Castle Airport – Atwater, California
 KMEV – Minden–Tahoe Airport – Minden, Nevada
 KMFE (MFE) – McAllen-Miller International Airport – McAllen, Texas
 KMFI – Marshfield Municipal Airport (Wisconsin) – Marshfield, Wisconsin
 KMFR (MFR) – Rogue Valley International-Medford Airport – Medford, Oregon
 KMFV – Accomack County Airport – Melfa, Virginia
 KMGE (MGE) – Dobbins Air Reserve Base (General Lucius D. Clay National Guard Center) – Marietta, Georgia
 KMGG – Maple Lake Municipal Airport – Maple Lake, Minnesota
 KMGJ – Orange County Airport – Montgomery, New York
 KMGM (MGM) – Montgomery Regional Airport (Dannelly Field) – Montgomery, Alabama
 KMGW (MGW) – Morgantown Municipal Airport – Morgantown, West Virginia
 KMGY (MGY) – Dayton Wright Brothers Airport – Dayton, Ohio
 KMHE (MHE) – Mitchell Municipal Airport – Mitchell, South Dakota
 KMHK (MHK) – Manhattan Regional Airport – Manhattan, Kansas
 KMHL – Marshall Memorial Municipal Airport – Marshall, Missouri
 KMHN – Hooker County Airport – Mullen, Nebraska
 KMHR (MHR) – Sacramento Mather Airport – Sacramento, California
 KMHS - Dunsmuir Municipal-Mott Airport - Mount Shasta, California
 KMHT (MHT) – Manchester-Boston Regional Airport – Manchester, New Hampshire
 KMHV – Mojave Air and Space Port (Civilian Aerospace Test Center) – Mojave, California
 KMIA (MIA) – Miami International Airport – Miami, Florida
 KMIB (MIB) – Minot Air Force Base – Minot, North Dakota
 KMIC – Crystal Airport – Crystal, Minnesota
 KMIO – Miami Municipal Airport – Miami, Oklahoma
 KMIT – Shafter Airport (Minter Field) – Shafter, California
 KMIV (MIV) – Millville Executive Airport – Millville, New Jersey
 KMJX – Robert J. Miller Air Park (Ocean County Airport) – Toms River, New Jersey
 KMKA – Miller Municipal Airport – Miller, South Dakota
 KMKC (MKC) – Charles B. Wheeler Downtown Airport – Kansas City, Missouri
 KMKE (MKE) – Milwaukee Mitchell International Airport – Milwaukee, Wisconsin
 KMKG (MKG) – Muskegon County Airport – Muskegon, Michigan
 KMKJ – Mountain Empire Airport – Marion / Wytheville, Virginia
 KMKL (MKL) – McKellar-Sipes Regional Airport – Jackson, Tennessee
 KMKO - Davis Field - Muskogee, Oklahoma
 KMKT (MKT) – Mankato Regional Airport – Mankato, Minnesota
 KMKY – Marco Island Airport – Naples, Florida
 KMLB (MLB) – Melbourne Orlando International Airport – Melbourne, Florida
 KMLC - McAlester Regional Airport - McAlester, Oklahoma
 KMLD – Malad City Airport – Malad City, Idaho
 KMLE - Millard Airport - Omaha, Nebraska
 KMLF (MLF) – Milford Municipal Airport (Ben and Judy Briscoe Field) – Milford, Utah
 KMLI (MLI) – Quad Cities International Airport – Moline, Illinois
 KMLS (MLS) – Miles City Municipal Airport – Miles City, Montana
 KMLT – Millinocket Municipal Airport – Millinocket, Maine
 KMLU (MLU) – Monroe Regional Airport – Monroe, Louisiana
 KMMH (MMH) – Mammoth Yosemite Airport – Mammoth Lakes, California
 KMMI – McMinn County Airport – Athens, Tennessee
 KMMK – Meriden Markham Municipal Airport – Meriden, Connecticut
 KMML (MML) – Southwest Minnesota Regional Airport (Marshall/Ryan Field) – Marshall, Minnesota
 KMMS – Selfs Airport – Marks, Mississippi
 KMMT – McEntire Joint National Guard Base – Eastover, South Carolina
 KMMU (MMU) – Morristown Municipal Airport – Morristown, New Jersey
 KMMV (MMV) – McMinnville Municipal Airport – McMinnville, Oregon
 KMNI – Santee Cooper Regional Airport – Manning, South Carolina
 KMNZ – Hamilton Municipal Airport – Hamilton, Texas
 KMOB (MOB) – Mobile Regional Airport – Mobile, Alabama
 KMOD (MOD) – Modesto City-County Airport – Modesto, California
 KMOR – Morristown Regional Airport – Morristown, Tennessee
 KMOT (MOT) – Minot International Airport – Minot, North Dakota
 KMPE – Philadelphia Municipal Airport – Philadelphia, Mississippi
 KMPI (MPI) – Mariposa-Yosemite Airport – Mariposa, California
 KMPJ – Petit Jean Park Airport – Morrilton, Arkansas
 KMPO – Pocono Mountains Municipal Airport – Mount Pocono, Pennsylvania
 KMPR – McPherson Airport – McPherson, Kansas
 KMPV – Edward F. Knapp State Airport – Barre-Montpelier, Vermont
 KMQI – Dare County Regional Airport – Manteo, North Carolina
 KMQJ (MQJ) – Indianapolis Regional Airport (Mount Comfort Airport) – Indianapolis, Indiana
 KMQS (CTH) – Chester County G. O. Carlson Airport – Coatesville, Pennsylvania
 KMQY (MQY) – Smyrna Airport – Smyrna, Tennessee
 KMRB (MRB) – Eastern West Virginia Regional Airport (Shepherd Field) – Martinsburg, West Virginia
 KMRF - Marfa Municipal Airport - Marfa, Texas
 KMRH – Michael J. Smith Field – Beaufort, North Carolina
 KMRN (MRN) – Foothills Regional Airport – Morganton, North Carolina
 KMRY (MRY) – Monterey Regional Airport – Monterey, California
 KMSL (MSL) – Northwest Alabama Regional Airport – Muscle Shoals, Alabama
 KMSN (MSN) – Dane County Regional Airport – Madison, Wisconsin
 KMSO (MSO) – Missoula International Airport – Missoula, Montana
 KMSP (MSP) – Minneapolis-Saint Paul International Airport – Bloomington, Minnesota
 KMSS (MSS) – Massena International Airport – Massena, New York
 KMSV – Sullivan County International Airport – Monticello, New York
 KMSY (MSY) – Louis Armstrong New Orleans International Airport – New Orleans, Louisiana
 KMTC (MTC) – Selfridge Air National Guard Base – Mt. Clemens, Michigan
 KMTH (MTH) – Florida Keys Marathon Airport – Marathon, Florida
 KMTJ – Montrose Regional Airport – Montrose, Colorado
 KMTN (MTN) – Martin State Airport – Baltimore, Maryland
 KMTP (MTP) – Montauk Airport – Montauk, New York
 KMTV – Blue Ridge Airport – Martinsville, Virginia
 KMTW – Manitowoc County Airport – Manitowoc, Wisconsin
 KMUO (MUO) – Mountain Home Air Force Base – Mountain Home, Idaho
 KMUT – Muscatine Municipal Airport – Muscatine, Iowa
 KMUU – Huntingdon County Airport – Mount Union, Pennsylvania (closed)
 KMVC (MVC) – Monroe County Airport – Monroeville, Alabama
 KMVI – Monte Vista Municipal Airport – Monte Vista, Colorado
 KMVL – Morrisville-Stowe State Airport – Morrisville, Vermont
 KMVM – Machias Valley Airport – Machias, Maine
 KMVY (MVY) – Martha's Vineyard Airport – Vineyard Haven, Massachusetts
 KMWH – Grant County International Airport – Moses Lake, Washington
 KMWC - Lawrence J. Timmerman Airport - Milwaukee, Wisconsin
 KMWK – Mount Airy/Surry County Airport – Mount Airy, North Carolina
 KMWL – Mineral Wells Airport – Mineral Wells, Texas
 KMXA – Manila Municipal Airport – Manila, Arkansas
 KMXF (MXF) – Maxwell Air Force Base – Montgomery, Alabama
 KMXO – Monticello Regional Airport – Monticello, Iowa
 KMYF – Montgomery-Gibbs Executive Airport – San Diego, California
 KMYL – McCall Municipal Airport – McCall, Idaho
 KMYR (MYR) – Myrtle Beach International Airport – Myrtle Beach, South Carolina
 KMYV (MYV) – Yuba County Airport – Marysville, California
 KMYZ – Marysville Municipal Airport – Marysville, Kansas
 KMZJ (MZJ) – Pinal Airpark – Marana, Arizona

KN 

 KNAB – Naval Air Station Albany – Albany, Georgia
 KNBC (BFT) – Marine Corps Air Station Beaufort – Beaufort, South Carolina
 KNBG (NBG) - Naval Air Station Joint Reserve Base New Orleans - Belle Chasse, Louisiana
 KNBJ (NHX) – Naval Outlying Landing Field Barin – Foley, Alabama
 KNBW (NBW) – Leeward Point Field – Guantanamo Bay, Cuba
 KNCA (NCA) – Marine Corps Air Station New River – Jacksonville, North Carolina
 KNDY – Naval Surface Warfare Center Dahlgren – Dahlgren, Virginia
 KNDZ - Naval Air Station Whiting Field South - Milton, Florida
 KNEL (NEL) – Naval Air Engineering Station Lakehurst – Lakehurst, New Jersey
 KNEN – Naval Outlying Landing Field Whitehouse – Jacksonville, Florida
 KNEW (NEW) – Lakefront Airport – New Orleans, Louisiana
 KNFD – Naval Outlying Landing Field Summerdale – Summerdale, Alabama
 KNFE – Naval Auxiliary Landing Field Fentress – Chesapeake, Virginia
 KNFG (NFG) – Marine Corps Air Station Camp Pendleton – Camp Pendleton, California
 KNFJ – Naval Outlying Landing Field Choctaw – Milton, Florida
 KNFL (NFL) – Naval Air Station Fallon – Fallon, Nevada
 KNFW – Naval Air Station Joint Reserve Base Fort Worth – Fort Worth, Texas
 KNGP (NGP) – Naval Air Station Corpus Christi – Corpus Christi, Texas
 KNGS – Naval Outlying Landing Field Santa Rosa – Milton, Florida
 KNGU (NGU) – Naval Station Norfolk – Norfolk, Virginia
 KNGZ – Naval Air Station Alameda – Alameda, California
 KNHK (NHK) – Naval Air Station Patuxent River – Patuxent River, Maryland
 KNHL – Naval Outlying Landing Field Wolf – Foley, Alabama
 KNHZ – Naval Air Station Brunswick – Brunswick, Maine (converted to civilian use see KBXM)
 KNID – Naval Air Weapons Station China Lake – Ridgecrest, California
 KNIP (NIP) – Naval Air Station Jacksonville – Jacksonville, Florida
 KNJK (NJK) – Naval Air Facility El Centro – El Centro, California
 KNJM – Marine Corps Auxiliary Landing Field Bogue – Swansboro, North Carolina
 KNJW – Naval Outlying Landing Field Joe Williams – Meridian, Mississippi
 KNKL – Naval Outlying Landing Field Holley – Fort Walton Beach, Florida
 KNKT (NKT) – Marine Corps Air Station Cherry Point – Cherry Point, North Carolina
 KNKX (NKX) – Marine Corps Air Station Miramar – San Diego, California
 KNLC – Naval Air Station Lemoore – Lemoore, California
 KNMM (NMM) – Naval Air Station Meridian – Meridian, Mississippi
 KNOW – Coast Guard Air Station Port Angeles – Port Angeles, Washington
 KNPA (NPA) – Naval Air Station Pensacola – Pensacola, Florida
 KNPI – Naval Outlying Landing Field Site 8 – Pensacola, Florida
 KNQA (NQA) – Millington Regional Jetport – Millington, Tennessee
 KNQB – Naval Outlying Landing Field Silverhill – Robertsdale, Alabama
 KNQX (NQX) – Naval Air Station Key West – Boca Chica Key, Florida
 KNRA – Naval Outlying Landing Field Coupeville – Coupeville, Washington
 KNRB – Naval Station Mayport – Jacksonville, Florida
 KNRN – Norton Municipal Airport – Norton, Kansas
 KNRQ – Naval Outlying Landing Field Spencer – Pace, Florida
 KNRS – Naval Outlying Landing Field Imperial Beach – Imperial Beach, California
KNSE - Naval Air Station Whiting Field North - Milton, Florida
 KNSI – Naval Outlying Landing Field San Nicolas Island – San Nicolas Island, California
 KNTD (NTD) – Naval Air Station Point Mugu – Oxnard, California
 KNTK – Marine Corps Air Station Tustin – Santa Ana, California
 KNTU (NTU) – Naval Air Station Oceana – Virginia Beach, Virginia
 KNUC – Naval Auxiliary Landing Field San Clemente Island – San Clemente, California
 KNUI – Naval Outlying Landing Field Webster – Saint Inigoes, Maryland
 KNUN – Naval Outlying Landing Field Saufley – Pensacola, Florida    
 KNUQ (NUQ) – Moffett Federal Airfield – Mountain View, California
 KNUW – Naval Air Station Whidbey Island – Oak Harbor, Washington
 KNVI – Naval Outlying Landing Field Pace – Wallace, Florida
 KNWL – Naval Outlying Landing Field Waldron – Corpus Christi, Texas
 KNYG – Marine Corps Air Facility Quantico – Quantico, Virginia
 KNYL (YUM) – Yuma International Airport / Marine Corps Air Station Yuma – Yuma, Arizona
 KNXF – Marine Corps Outlying Field (Red Beach) Camp Pendleton - Camp Pendleton, California
 KNXP – Marine Corps Air Ground Combat Center Twentynine Palms – Twentynine Palms, California
 KNXX – Naval Air Station Joint Reserve Base Willow Grove – Willow Grove, Pennsylvania
 KNZJ – Marine Corps Air Station El Toro – Santa Ana, California
 KNZY (NZY) – Naval Air Station North Island – San Diego, California

KO 

 KOAJ – Albert J. Ellis Airport – Jacksonville, North Carolina
 KOAK – Oakland International Airport – Oakland, California
 KOAR – Marina Municipal Airport – Marina, California
 KOBE – Okeechobee County Airport – Okeechobee, Florida
 KOBI – Woodbine Municipal Airport – Woodbine, New Jersey
 KOCF – Ocala International Airport (Jim Taylor Field) – Ocala, Florida
 KOCH (OCH) – Nacogdoches A.L. Mangham Jr. Regional Airport – Nacogdoches, Texas
 KOCW – Washington–Warren Airport – Washington, North Carolina
 KODO - Odessa-Schlemeyer Field - Odessa, Texas
 KODX – Evelyn Sharp Field – Ord, Nebraska
 KOEL – Oakley Municipal Airport – Oakley, Kansas
 KOFF – Offutt Air Force Base – Omaha, Nebraska
 KOFK – Norfolk Regional Airport (Karl Stefan Memorial Field) – Norfolk, Nebraska
 KOFP – Hanover County Municipal Airport – Richmond / Ashland, Virginia
 KOGA – Searle Field – Ogallala, Nebraska
 KOGB – Orangeburg Municipal Airport – Orangeburg, South Carolina
 KOGD – Ogden-Hinckley Airport – Ogden, Utah
 KOGS – Ogdensburg International Airport – Ogdensburg, New York
 KOIC – Lt. Warren Eaton Airport – Norwich, New York
 KOIN – Oberlin Municipal Airport – Oberlin, Kansas
 KOJA - Thomas P. Stafford Airport - Weatherford, Oklahoma
 KOJC – Johnson County Executive Airport – Olathe, Kansas
 KOKB – Oceanside Municipal Airport (Bob Maxwell Field) – Oceanside, California
 KOKC (OKC) – Will Rogers World Airport – Oklahoma City, Oklahoma
 KOKK – Kokomo Municipal Airport – Kokomo, Indiana
 KOKM - Okmulgee Regional Airport - Okmulgee, Oklahoma
 KOKS – Garden County Airport – Oshkosh, Nebraska
 KOKV – Winchester Regional Airport – Winchester, Virginia
 KOLD – Old Town Municipal Airport and Seaplane Base (Dewitt Field) – Old Town, Maine
 KOLE – Cattaraugus County-Olean Airport – Olean, New York
 KOLF – L. M. Clayton Airport – Wolf Point, Montana
 KOLM – Olympia Regional Airport – Olympia, Washington
 KOLS (OLS) – Nogales International Airport – Nogales, Arizona
 KOLU – Columbus Municipal Airport – Columbus, Nebraska
 KOLV – Olive Branch Airport – Olive Branch, Mississippi
 KOLZ – Oelwein Municipal Airport – Oelwein, Iowa
 KOMA – Eppley Field – Omaha, Nebraska
 KOMH – Orange County Airport – Orange, Virginia
 KOMK – Omak Airport – Omak, Washington
 KOMN – Ormond Beach Municipal Airport – Ormond Beach, Florida
 KONA – Winona Municipal Airport (Max Conrad Field) – Winona, Minnesota
 KONL – O'Neill Municipal Airport (John L. Baker Field) – O'Neill, Nebraska
 KONM (ONM) – Socorro Municipal Airport – Socorro, New Mexico
 KONO – Ontario Municipal Airport – Ontario, Oregon
 KONP – Newport Municipal Airport – Newport, Oregon
 KONT – Ontario International Airport – Ontario, California
 KONX – Currituck County Regional Airport – Currituck, North Carolina
 KOPF – Miami-Opa Locka Executive Airport – Opa-locka, Florida
 KOPL – St. Landry Parish Airport (Ahart Field) – Opelousas, Louisiana
 KOQN – Brandywine Airport – West Chester, Pennsylvania
 KOQU (OQU) – Quonset State Airport – North Kingstown, Rhode Island
 KORB – Orr Regional Airport – Orr, Minnesota
 KORD – O'Hare International Airport – Chicago, Illinois
 KORE – Orange Municipal Airport – Orange, Massachusetts
 KORF – Norfolk International Airport – Norfolk, Virginia
 KORG – Orange County Airport – Orange, Texas
 KORH – Worcester Regional Airport – Worcester, Massachusetts
 KORL – Orlando Executive Airport – Orlando, Florida
 KORS (ESD) – Orcas Island Airport – Eastsound, Washington
 KOSC (OSC) – Oscoda-Wurtsmith Airport – Oscoda, Michigan
 KOSH – Wittman Regional Airport – Oshkosh, Wisconsin
 KOSU (OSU) – Ohio State University Airport (OSU Don Scott Airport) – Columbus, Ohio
 KOSX – Kosciusko-Attala County Airport – Kosciusko, Mississippi
 KOTH – Southwest Oregon Regional Airport – North Bend, Oregon
 KOTM – Ottumwa Regional Airport – Ottumwa, Iowa
 KOUN – University of Oklahoma Westheimer Airport – Norman, Oklahoma
 KOVE – Oroville Municipal Airport – Oroville, California
 KOVS – Boscobel Airport – Boscobel, Wisconsin
 KOWB – Owensboro-Daviess County Regional Airport – Owensboro, Kentucky
 KOWD – Norwood Memorial Airport – Norwood, Massachusetts
 KOWI – Ottawa Municipal Airport – Ottawa, Kansas
 KOWK – Central Maine Airport of Norridgewock – Norridgewock, Maine
 KOXB (OCE) – Ocean City Municipal Airport – Ocean City, Maryland
 KOXC – Waterbury-Oxford Airport – Oxford, Connecticut
 KOXD – Miami University Airport – Oxford, Ohio
 KOXR – Oxnard Airport – Oxnard, California
 KOYM – St. Marys Municipal Airport – Saint Marys, Pennsylvania
 KOZA - Ozona Municipal Airport - Ozona, Texas
 KOZR (OZR) – Cairns Army Airfield – Fort Rucker / Ozark, Alabama
 KOZS (OZS) – Camdenton Memorial Airport – Camdenton, Missouri
 KOZW – Livingston County Spencer J. Hardy Airport – Howell, Michigan

KP 

 KPAE (PAE) – Snohomish County Airport (Paine Field) – Everett, Washington
 KPAH (PAH) - Barkley Regional Airport - Paducah, Kentucky
 KPAM – Tyndall AFB – Panama City, FL
 KPAN (PJB) – Payson Airport – Payson, Arizona
 KPAO – Palo Alto Airport – Palo Alto, California
 KPBF – Grider Field – Pine Bluff, Arkansas
 KPBG (PBG) – Plattsburgh International Airport – Plattsburgh, New York
 KPBI (PBI) – Palm Beach International Airport – West Palm Beach, Florida
 KPBX – Pike County Airport (Hatcher Field) – Pikeville, Kentucky
 KPCM – Plant City Airport – Plant City, Florida
 KPCU – Picayune-Pearl River County Airport – Picayune, Mississippi
 KPCW – Erie–Ottawa International Airport – Port Clinton, Ohio
 KPCZ – Waupaca Municipal Airport (Brunner Field) – Waupaca, Wisconsin
 KPDC – Prairie du Chien Municipal Airport – Prairie du Chien, Wisconsin
 KPDK (PDK) – DeKalb-Peachtree Airport – Atlanta, Georgia
 KPDT (PDT) – Eastern Oregon Regional Airport – Pendleton, Oregon
 KPDX (PDX) – Portland International Airport – Portland, Oregon
 KPEO – Penn Yan Airport (Yates County Airport) – Penn Yan, New York
 KPEQ (PEQ) - Pecos Municipal Airport - Pecos, Texas
 KPFC – Pacific City State Airport – Pacific City, Oregon
 KPFN – Panama City-Bay County International Airport – Panama City, FL (closed in 2010)
 KPGA (PGA) – Page Municipal Airport – Page, Arizona
 KPGD (PGD) – Punta Gorda Airport – Punta Gorda, Florida
 KPGR – Kirk Field – Paragould, Arkansas
 KPGV (PGV) – Pitt-Greenville Airport – Greenville, North Carolina
 KPHD – Harry Clever Field Airport – New Philadelphia, Ohio
 KPHF (PFH) – Newport News/Williamsburg International Airport – Newport News, Virginia
 KPHG – Phillipsburg Municipal Airport – Phillipsburg, Kansas
 KPHH – Robert F. Swinnie Airport – Andrews, South Carolina
 KPHK – Palm Beach County Glades Airport – Pahokee, Florida
 KPHL (PHL) – Philadelphia International Airport – Philadelphia, Pennsylvania
 KPHP – Philip Airport – Philip, South Dakota
 KPHT – Henry County Airport – Paris, Tennessee
 KPHX (PHX) – Phoenix Sky Harbor International Airport – Phoenix, Arizona
 KPIA (PIA) – General Wayne A. Downing Peoria International Airport – Peoria, Illinois
 KPIB (PIB) – Hattiesburg-Laurel Regional Airport – Hattiesburg, Mississippi
 KPIE (PIE) – St. Pete-Clearwater International Airport – St. Petersburg, Florida
 KPIH (PIH) – Pocatello Regional Airport – Pocatello, Idaho
 KPIR (PIR) – Pierre Regional Airport – Pierre, South Dakota
 KPIT (PIT) – Pittsburgh International Airport – Pittsburgh, Pennsylvania
 KPKB (PKB) – Mid-Ohio Valley Regional Airport – Parkersburg, West Virginia
 KPKV (PKV) – Calhoun County Airport – Port Lavaca, Texas
 KPLB (PLB) – Clinton County Airport  – Plattsburgh, New York (closed)
 KPLK – M. Graham Clark Downtown Airport – Point Lookout, Missouri
 KPLN (PLN) – Pellston Regional Airport – Pellston, Michigan
 KPLR (PLR) – St. Clair County Airport – Pell City, Alabama
 KPLU (PLU) - Pierce County Airport (Thun Field) - Graham, Washington
 KPMB – Pembina Municipal Airport – Pembina, North Dakota
 KPMD – Palmdale Regional Airport – Palmdale, California
 KPMV (PMV) – Plattsmouth Municipal Airport – Plattsmouth, Nebraska
 KPMZ (PMZ) – Plymouth Municipal Airport – Plymouth, North Carolina
 KPNA (PWY) – Ralph Wenz Field – Pinedale, Wyoming
 KPNC (PNC) - Ponca City Regional Airport - Ponca City, Oklahoma
 KPNE (PNE) – Northeast Philadelphia Airport – Philadelphia, Pennsylvania
 KPNM (PNM) – Princeton Municipal Airport – Princeton, Minnesota
 KPNN (PNN) – Princeton Municipal Airport – Princeton, Maine
 KPNS (PNS) – Pensacola International Airport – Pensacola, Florida
 KPOB – Pope Field (military) – Fayetteville, North Carolina
 KPOC – Brackett Field – La Verne, California
 KPOU – Hudson Valley Regional Airport (Poughkeepsie Airport) – Poughkeepsie, New York
 KPOY – Powell Municipal Airport – Powell, Wyoming
 KPPA (PPA) – Perry LeFors Field – Pampa, Texas
 KPPF – Tri-City Airport – Parsons, Kansas
 KPQI (PQI) – Presque Isle International Airport – Presque Isle, Maine
 KPQL (PGL) – Trent Lott International Airport – Pascagoula, Mississippi
 KPRB – Paso Robles Municipal Airport – Paso Robles, California
 KPRC (PRC) – Ernest A. Love Field – Prescott, Arizona
 KPRN – Mac Crenshaw Memorial Airport – Greenville, Alabama
 KPRX – Cox Field – Paris, Texas
 KPSB – Mid-State Regional Airport – Philipsburg, Pennsylvania
 KPSC (PSC) – Tri-Cities Airport – Pasco, Washington
 KPSF – Pittsfield Municipal Airport – Pittsfield, Massachusetts
 KPSK – New River Valley Airport – Dublin, Virginia
 KPSM – Portsmouth International Airport at Pease – Portsmouth, New Hampshire
 KPSN (PSN) – Palestine Municipal Airport – Palestine, Texas
 KPSO – Stevens Field – Pagosa Springs, Colorado
 KPSP (PSP) – Palm Springs International Airport – Palm Springs, California
 KPTB – Dinwiddie County Airport – Petersburg, Virginia
 KPTD – Potsdam Municipal Airport (Damon Field) – Potsdam, New York
 KPTK (PTK) – Oakland County International Airport – Waterford Township, Michigan
 KPTN – Harry P. Williams Memorial Airport – Patterson, Louisiana
 KPTS – Atkinson Municipal Airport – Pittsburg, Kansas
 KPTT (PTT) – Pratt Regional Airport – Pratt, Kansas
 KPTV (PTV) – Porterville Municipal Airport – Porterville, California
 KPTW – Heritage Field – Pottstown, Pennsylvania
 KPUB (PUB) – Pueblo Memorial Airport – Pueblo, Colorado
 KPUC – Carbon County Regional Airport (Buck Davis Field) – Price, Utah
 KPUJ – Silver Comet Field at Paulding Northwest Atlanta Airport – Dallas, Georgia
 KPUW (PUW) – Pullman-Moscow Regional Airport – Pullman, Washington
 KPVB – Platteville Municipal Airport – Platteville, Wisconsin
 KPVC – Provincetown Municipal Airport – Provincetown, Massachusetts
 KPVD (PVD) – T.F. Green State Airport – Providence, Rhode Island
 KPVE – Beech River Regional Airport – Darden, Tennessee
 KPVF – Placerville Airport – Placerville, California
 KPVG – Hampton Roads Executive Airport – Chesapeake, Virginia
 KPVJ - Pauls Valley Municipal Airport - Pauls Valley, Oklahoma
 KPVU (PVU) – Provo Municipal Airport – Provo, Utah
 KPVW (PVW) - Hale County Airport - Plainview, Texas
 KPWA (PWA) - Wiley Post Airport - Oklahoma City, Oklahoma
 KPWD – Sher-Wood Airport – Plentywood, Montana
 KPWK (PWK) – Chicago Executive Airport (formerly PalWaukee) – Wheeling, Illinois
 KPWM (PWM) – Portland International Jetport – Portland, Maine
 KPWT (PWT) – Bremerton National Airport – Bremerton, Washington
 KPXE (PXE) – Perry-Houston County Airport – Perry, Georgia
 KPYG – Pageland Airport – Pageland, South Carolina
 KPYM (PYM) – Plymouth Municipal Airport – Plymouth, Massachusetts
 KPYP (PYP) – Centre-Piedmont-Cherokee County Regional Airport – Centre, Alabama
 KPYX (PYX) – Perryton Ochiltree County Airport - Perryton, Texas

KQ 

(METAR weather station sites operated by the U.S. Department of Defense)

 KQA7 – Tarin Kowt, Afghanistan
 KQAD – FOB Echo, Al Diwaniyah, Iraq
 KQAE – al Musayyib FOB, Iraq
 KQAJ – Al Asad AB, Iraq
 KQAO – Hanau AAF, Germany (closed since 2007)
 KQAQ – Camp Taji, Iraq
 KQAX – Camp Victory (BIAP), Iraq
 KQAY – Patton AAF, Camp Arifjan, Kuwait
 KQCO – FOB Q-West (Al-Qayyarah), Iraq
 KQCT – Ar Ramadi, Iraq
 KQCU – Fort Chaffee, Arkansas
 KQD9 – FOB Salerno, Khost, Afghanistan
 KQDM – Orgun, Afghanistan
 KQEZ – Al Taqaddum AB, Iraq
 KQGV – Ali Al Salem AB, Kuwait
 KQGX – Al Dhafra AB, United Arab Emirates
 KQIR – Al Udeid AB, Qatar
 KQIU – Fire Base Lilley, Shkin, Afghanistan
 KQL5 – Jalalabad, Afghanistan
 KQMA – Camp Fallujah, Iraq
 KQMG – Mudaysis, Iraq
 KQMH – Camp Korean Village (KV) (Ar Rutbah), Iraq
 KQNC – Souda Bay AB, Greece
 KQNN – Naples, Italy
 KQNS – NAS Sigonella, Italy
 KQNT – NAS Keflavik, Iceland
 KQNY – Camp Ramadi, Iraq
 KQOS – Oscura Range, New Mexico
 KQPC – Camp Gannon (Husaybah), Iraq
 KQPD – COP Haditha, Iraq
 KQRY – Ghazni, Afghanistan
 KQSA – Bagram AB, Afghanistan
 KQSE – Mosul North, Iraq
 KQSL – COB Speicher (Al Sahra Airfield), Iraq
 KQSM – Misawa AB, Japan
 KQSR – Sharan, Afghanistan
 KQTA – NAF Atsugi, Japan
 KQTI – Tal Afar, Iraq
 KQTO – Joint Base Balad/LSA Anaconda, Iraq
 KQTU – FOB Marez (Mosul), Iraq
 KQTX – Kirkuk AB, Iraq
 KQTZ – Baghdad International Airport, Iraq
 KQVO – Al-Qa'im, Iraq
 KQWM – Camp Buehring, Kuwait
 KQXJ – Ali Air Base (Nasiriyah), Iraq
 KQXN – Najaf, Iraq
 KQYB – Faurei, Romania

KR 

 KRAC (RAC) – John H. Batten Airport (Batten International Airport) – Racine, Wisconsin
 KRAL – Riverside Municipal Airport – Riverside, California
 KRAP (RAP) – Rapid City Regional Airport – Rapid City, South Dakota
 KRAW (RAW) – Warsaw Municipal Airport – Warsaw, Missouri
 KRBD (RBD) – Dallas Executive Airport – Dallas, Texas
 KRBE – Rock County Airport – Bassett, Nebraska
 KRBG (RBG) – Roseburg Regional Airport (Major General Marion E. Carl Memorial Field) – Roseburg, Oregon
 KRBL – Red Bluff Municipal Airport – Red Bluff, California
 KRBM – Robinson Army Airfield – Camp Robinson, Arkansas
 KRBW (RBW) – Lowcountry Regional Airport – Walterboro, South Carolina
 KRCA – Ellsworth Air Force Base – Rapid City, South Dakota
 KRCE (RCE) - Clarence E. Page Municipal Airport - Oklahoma City, Oklahoma
 KRCM – SkyHaven Airport – Warrensburg, Missouri
 KRCT (RCT) – Nartron Field – Reed City, Michigan
 KRDD (RDD) – Redding Municipal Airport – Redding, California
 KRDG (RDG) – Reading Regional Airport – Reading, Pennsylvania
 KRDM (RDM) – Roberts Field (Redmond Municipal Airport) – Redmond, Oregon
 KRDR – Grand Forks Air Force Base – Grand Forks, North Dakota
 KRDU (RDU) – Raleigh-Durham International Airport – Raleigh, North Carolina
 KRED – Red Lodge Airport – Red Lodge, Montana
 KREG – Louisiana Regional Airport – Gonzalez, Louisiana
 KREI – Redlands Municipal Airport – Redlands, California
 KREO – Rome State Airport – Rome, Oregon
 KRFD (RFD) – Chicago Rockford International Airport – Rockford, Illinois
KRGK – Red Wing Regional Airport – Red Wing, Minnesota
 KRHI (RHI) – Rhinelander-Oneida County Airport – Rhinelander, Wisconsin
 KRHP – Western Carolina Regional Airport – Andrews, North Carolina
 KRHV – Reid-Hillview Airport of Santa Clara County – San Jose, California
 KRIC (RIC) – Richmond International Airport – Sandston, Virginia
 KRID – Richmond Municipal Airport – Richmond, Indiana
 KRIF – Richfield Municipal Airport – Richfield, Utah
 KRIL (RIL) – Garfield County Regional Airport – Rifle, Colorado
 KRIR – Flabob Airport – Riverside, California
 KRIU – Rancho Murieta Airport – Rancho Murieta, California
 KRIV – March Air Reserve Base – Riverside, California
 KRIW (RIW) – Central Wyoming Regional Airport – Riverton, Wyoming
 KRJD – Ridgely Airpark – Ridgely, Maryland
 KRKR - Robert S. Kerr Airport - Poteau, Oklahoma
 KRKD (RKD) – Knox County Regional Airport – Rockland, Maine
 KRKS (RKS) – Southwest Wyoming Regional Airport – Rock Springs, Wyoming
 KRLD – Richland Airport – Richland, Washington
 KRME (RME) – Griffiss International Airport – Rome, New York
 KRMN – Stafford Regional Airport – Stafford, Virginia
 KRND – Randolph Air Force Base – San Antonio, Texas
 KRNM – Ramona Airport – Ramona, California
 KRNO (RNO) – Reno-Tahoe International Airport – Reno, Nevada
 KRNT (RNT) – Renton Municipal Airport – Renton, Washington
 KRNV – Cleveland Municipal Airport – Cleveland, Mississippi
 KROA (ROA) – Roanoke-Blacksburg Regional Airport (Woodrum Field) – Roanoke, Virginia
 KROC (ROC) – Greater Rochester International Airport – Rochester, New York
 KROG – Rogers Executive Airport (Carter Field) – Rogers, Arkansas
 KROW (ROW) – Roswell International Air Center – Roswell, New Mexico
 KRPB – Belleville Municipal Airport – Belleville, Kansas
 KRPD – Rice Lake Regional Airport (Carl's Field) – Rice Lake, Wisconsin
 KRPH – Graham Municipal Airport – Graham, Texas
 KRPX – Roundup Airport – Roundup, Montana
 KRQE – Window Rock Airport – Window Rock, Arizona
 KRRT (RRT) – Warroad International Memorial Airport (Swede Carlson Field) – Warroad, Minnesota
 KRSL – Russell Municipal Airport – Russell, Kansas
 KRST (RST) – Rochester International Airport – Rochester, Minnesota
 KRSW (RSW) – Southwest Florida International Airport – Fort Myers, Florida
 KRTN (RTN) – Raton Municipal Airport/Crews Field – Raton, New Mexico
 KRTS - Reno Stead Airport - Reno, Nevada
 KRUE – Russellville Regional Airport – Russellville, Arkansas
 KRUG – Rugby Municipal Airport – Rugby, North Dakota
 KRUQ (SRW) – Mid-Carolina Regional Airport – Salisbury, North Carolina
 KRUT (RUT) – Rutland-Southern Vermont Regional Airport – Rutland, Vermont
 KRVL – Mifflin County Airport – Reedsville, Pennsylvania
 KRVS (RVS) – Richard Lloyd Jones Jr. Airport – Tulsa, Oklahoma
 KRWI – Rocky Mount-Wilson Regional Airport – Rocky Mount, North Carolina
 KRWL – Rawlins Municipal Airport – Rawlins, Wyoming
 KRWV – Caldwell Municipal Airport – Caldwell, Texas
 KRXE – Rexburg-Madison County Airport – Rexburg, Idaho
 KRYN – Ryan Field – Tucson, Arizona
 KRYV – Watertown Municipal Airport – Watertown, Wisconsin
 KRYW – Lago Vista TX-Rusty Allen Airport – Lago Vista, Texas
 KRYY – Cobb County International-McCollum Field Airport – Kennesaw, Georgia
 KRZL – Jasper County Airport – Rensselaer, Indiana
 KRZN – Burnett County Airport – Siren, Wisconsin
 KRZT – Ross County Airport – Chillicothe, Ohio
 KRZZ – Halifax County Airport – Roanoke Rapids, North Carolina

KS 

 KSAA – Shively Airport – Saratoga, Wyoming
 KSAC – Sacramento Executive Airport – Sacramento, California
 KSAD (SAD) – Safford Regional Airport – Safford, Arizona
 KSAF (SAF) – Santa Fe Regional Airport – Santa Fe, New Mexico
 KSAN (SAN) – San Diego International Airport (Lindbergh Field) – San Diego, California
 KSAS – Salton Sea Airport – Salton City, California
 KSAT (SAT) – San Antonio International Airport – San Antonio, Texas
 KSAV (SAV) – Savannah/Hilton Head International Airport – Savannah, Georgia
 KSAW (MQT) - Sawyer International Airport – Marquette, Michigan
 KSAZ – Staples Municipal Airport – Staples, Minnesota
 KSBA (SBA) – Santa Barbara Municipal Airport – Santa Barbara, California
 KSBD (SBD) – San Bernardino International Airport – San Bernardino, California
 KSBM (SBM) – Sheboygan County Memorial Airport – Sheboygan, Wisconsin
 KSBN (SBN) – South Bend International Airport – South Bend, Indiana
 KSBO – East Georgia Regional Airport – Swainsboro, Georgia
 KSBP – San Luis Obispo County Regional Airport – San Luis Obispo, California
 KSBS (SBS) – Steamboat Springs Airport (Bob Adams Field) – Steamboat Springs, Colorado
 KSBX – Shelby Airport – Shelby, Montana
 KSBY (SBY) – Salisbury-Ocean City Wicomico Regional Airport (SBY Regional Airport) – Salisbury, Maryland
 KSCB – Scribner State Airport – Scribner, Nebraska
 KSCD – Sylacauga Municipal Airport (Merkel Field) – Sylacauga, Alabama
 KSCH – Schenectady County Airport – Schenectady, New York
 KSCK (SCK) – Stockton Metropolitan Airport – Stockton, California
 KSCR – Siler City Municipal Airport –  Siler City, North Carolina
 KSDC – Williamson-Sodus Airport – Williamson/Sodus, New York
 KSDF (SDF) – Louisville International Airport – Louisville, Kentucky
 KSDL (SCF) – Scottsdale Airport – Scottsdale, Arizona
 KSDM – Brown Field Municipal Airport – San Diego, California
 KSDY – Sidney-Richland Municipal Airport – Sidney, Montana
 KSEA (SEA) – Seattle-Tacoma International Airport – Seattle, Washington
 KSEE – Gillespie Field – San Diego, California
 KSEF (SEF) – Sebring Regional Airport – Sebring, Florida
 KSEG (SEG) – Penn Valley Airport – Selinsgrove, Pennsylvania
 KSEM (SEM) – Craig Field – Selma, Alabama
 KSEP – Stephenville Clark Regional Airport – Stephenville, Texas
 KSEZ (SDX) – Sedona Airport – Sedona, Arizona
 KSFB (SFB) – Orlando Sanford International Airport – Sanford, Florida
 KSFD – Winner Regional Airport (Bob Wiley Field) – Winner, South Dakota
 KSFF (SFF) – Felts Field – Spokane, Washington
 KSFM – Sanford Seacoast Regional Airport – Sanford, Maine
 KSFO (SFO) – San Francisco International Airport – San Francisco, California
 KSFQ – Suffolk Executive Airport – Suffolk, Virginia
 KSFZ – North Central State Airport – Pawtucket, Rhode Island
 KSGF (SGF) – Springfield-Branson National Airport – Springfield, Missouri
 KSGJ – Northeast Florida Regional Airport – St. Augustine, Florida
 KSGT (SGT) – Stuttgart Municipal Airport – Stuttgart, Arkansas
 KSGU – St. George Municipal Airport – St. George, Utah  (closed 2011)
 KSGU (SGU) – St. George Regional Airport – St. George, Utah
 KSHD (SHD) – Shenandoah Valley Regional Airport – Staunton, Virginia
 KSHN – Sanderson Field – Shelton, Washington
 KSHR (SHR) – Sheridan County Airport – Sheridan, Wyoming
 KSHV (SHV) – Shreveport Regional Airport – Shreveport, Louisiana
 KSIF – Rockingham County NC Shiloh Airport – Stoneville, North Carolina
 KSIK (SIK) – Sikeston Memorial Municipal Airport – Sikeston, Missouri
 KSIY (SIY) – Siskiyou County Airport – Montague, California
 KSJC (SJC) – Norman Y. Mineta San José International Airport – San Jose, California
 KSJN (SJN) – St. Johns Industrial Air Park – St. Johns, Arizona
 KSJT (SJT) – San Angelo Regional Airport (Mathis Field) – San Angelo, Texas
 KSKA – Fairchild Air Force Base – Spokane, Washington
 KSKF – Kelly Field Annex (formerly Kelly Air Force Base) – San Antonio, Texas
 KSKI – Sac City Municipal Airport – Sac City, Iowa
 KSKX – Taos Regional Airport – Taos, New Mexico
 KSLB – Storm Lake Municipal Airport – Storm Lake, Iowa
 KSLC (SLC) – Salt Lake City International Airport – Salt Lake City, Utah
 KSLE (SLE) – McNary Field (Salem Municipal Airport) – Salem, Oregon
 KSLG (SLG) – Smith Field – Siloam Springs, Arkansas
 KSLI – Los Alamitos Army Airfield – Los Alamitos, California
 KSLK (SLK) – Adirondack Regional Airport – Saranac Lake, New York
 KSLN (SLN) – Salina Regional Airport – Salina, Kansas
 KSLR – Sulphur Springs Municipal Airport – Sulphur Springs, Texas
 KSMD (SMD) – Smith Field – Fort Wayne, Indiana
 KSME – Lake Cumberland Regional Airport – Somerset, Kentucky
 KSMF(SMF) – Sacramento International Airport – Sacramento, California
 KSMN – Lemhi County Airport – Salmon, Idaho
 KSMO (SMO) – Santa Monica Airport (Clover Field) – Santa Monica, California
 KSMQ – Somerset Airport (George Walker Field) – Somerville, New Jersey
 KSMS – Sumter Airport – Sumter, South Carolina
 KSMX (SMX) – Santa Maria Public Airport (Capt. G. Allan Hancock Field) – Santa Maria, California
 KSNA (SNA) – John Wayne Airport – Santa Ana, California
 KSNC – Chester Airport – Chester, Connecticut
 KSNK - Winston Field - Snyder, Texas
 KSNL (SNL) – Shawnee Regional Airport – Shawnee, Oklahoma
 KSNS (SNS) – Salinas Municipal Airport – Salinas, California
 KSNT - Stanley Airport - Stanley, Idaho (airport is designated as 2U7 by FAA)
 KSNY (SNY) – Sidney Municipal Airport (Lloyd W. Carr Field) – Sidney, Nebraska
 KSOA (SOA) - Sonora Municipal Airport - Sonora, Texas
 KSOP (SOP) – Moore County Airport (Pinehurst Regional Airport) – Whispering Pines, North Carolina
 KSOW (SOW) – Show Low Regional Airport – Show Low, Arizona
 KSPA (SPA) – Spartanburg Downtown Memorial Airport – Spartanburg, South Carolina
 KSPB – Scappoose Industrial Airpark – Scappoose, Oregon
 KSPD – Springfield Municipal Airport – Springfield, Colorado
 KSPF – Black Hills Airport (Clyde Ice Field) – Spearfish, South Dakota
 KSPG – Albert Whitted Airport – St. Petersburg, Florida
 KSPH - Springhill Airport - Springhill, Louisiana
 KSPI (SPI) - Abraham Lincoln Capital Airport - Springfield, Illinois
 KSPS (SPS) – Wichita Falls Regional Airport / Sheppard Air Force Base – Wichita Falls, Texas
 KSPW (SPW) – Spencer Municipal Airport (Northwest Iowa Regional Airport) – Spencer, Iowa
 KSPX – Houston Gulf Airport – League City, Texas (closed 2002)
 KSPZ - Silver Springs Airport - Silver Springs, Nevada
 KSQL (SQL) – San Carlos Airport – San Carlos, California
 KSRC – Searcy Municipal Airport – Searcy, Arkansas
 KSRQ (SRQ) – Sarasota-Bradenton International Airport – Sarasota, Florida
 KSRR (RUI) – Sierra Blanca Regional Airport – Ruidoso, New Mexico
 KSSC – Shaw Air Force Base – Sumter, South Carolina
 KSSF (SSF) – Stinson Municipal Airport – San Antonio, Texas
 KSSI (SSI) – McKinnon St. Simons Island Airport – Brunswick, Georgia
 KSSN – Seneca Army Airfield – Romulus, New York
 KSSQ – Shell Lake Municipal Airport – Shell Lake, Wisconsin
 KSTC – St. Cloud Regional Airport – St. Cloud, Minnesota
 KSTF – George M. Bryan Airport – Starkville, Mississippi
 KSTK – Sterling Municipal Airport – Sterling, Colorado
 KSTL (STL) – St. Louis Lambert International Airport – St. Louis, Missouri
 KSTP (STP) – St. Paul Downtown Airport (Holman Field) – St. Paul, Minnesota
 KSTS (STS) – Charles M. Schulz-Sonoma County Airport – Santa Rosa, California
 KSUA – Witham Field – Stuart, Florida
 KSUN (SUN) – Friedman Memorial Airport – Hailey, Idaho
 KSUS – Spirit of St. Louis Airport – St. Louis, Missouri
 KSUT – Cape Fear Regional Jetport (Howie Franklin Field) – Oak Island, North Carolina
 KSUU – Travis Air Force Base – Fairfield, California
 KSUW – Richard I. Bong Airport – Superior, Wisconsin
 KSUX (SUX) – Sioux Gateway Airport – Sioux City, Iowa
 KSUZ – Saline County Regional Airport – Benton, Arkansas
 KSVC (SVC) – Grant County Airport – Silver City, New Mexico
 KSVE – Susanville Municipal Airport – Susanville, California
 KSVH – Statesville Regional Airport – Statesville, North Carolina
 KSWF (SWF) – Stewart International Airport – New Windsor, New York
 KSWI – Sherman Municipal Airport – Sherman, Texas
 KSWO (SWO) - Stillwater Regional Airport - Stillwater, Oklahoma
 KSWT – Seward Municipal Airport – Seward, Nebraska
 KSWW (SWW) – Avenger Field – Sweetwater, Texas
 KSXL – Summersville Airport – Summersville, West Virginia
 KSXT - Sexton Summit Weather Station - Grants Pass, Oregon (not an airport)
 KSXU – Santa Rosa Route 66 Airport – Santa Rosa, New Mexico
 KSYF – Cheyenne County Municipal Airport – St. Francis, Kansas
 KSYI – Shelbyville Municipal Airport (Bomar Field) – Shelbyville, Tennessee
 KSYL – Roberts Army Heliport – Camp Roberts, San Luis Obispo County, California
 KSYN (SYN) – Stanton Airfield – Stanton, Minnesota
 KSYR (SYR) – Syracuse Hancock International Airport – Syracuse, New York
 KSZL – Whiteman Air Force Base – Johnson County, Missouri
 KSZP – Santa Paula Airport – Santa Paula, California
 KSZT – Sandpoint Airport (Dave Wall Field) – Sandpoint, Idaho

KT 

 KTAD – Perry Stokes Airport – Trinidad, Colorado
 KTAN – Taunton Municipal Airport – Taunton, Massachusetts
 KTBN (TBN) – Waynesville-St. Robert Regional Airport – Fort Leonard Wood, Missouri
 KTBR (TBR) – Statesboro–Bulloch County Airport – Statesboro, Georgia
 KTBX – Shoshoni Municipal Airport – Shoshoni, Wyoming
 KTCC – Tucumcari Municipal Airport – Tucumcari, New Mexico
 KTCL (TCL) – Tuscaloosa Regional Airport – Tuscaloosa, Alabama
 KTCM – McChord Air Force Base – Tacoma, Washington
 KTCS – Truth or Consequences Municipal Airport – Truth or Consequences, New Mexico
 KTCY – Tracy Municipal Airport – Tracy, California
 KTDF – Person County Airport – Roxboro, North Carolina
 KTDO – Toledo-Winston Carlock Memorial Airport – Toledo, Washington
KTDW – Tradewind Airport – Amarillo, Texas
 KTEB (TEB) – Teterboro Airport – Teterboro, New Jersey
 KTEL – Perry County Municipal Airport – Tell City, Indiana
 KTEX (TEX) – Telluride Regional Airport – Telluride, Colorado
 KTGI – Tangier Island Airport – Tangier, Virginia
 KTHM – Thompson Falls Airport – Thompson Falls, Montana
 KTHP – Hot Springs County Municipal Airport – Thermopolis, Wyoming
 KTHV (THV) – York Airport – York, Pennsylvania
 KTIK – Tinker Air Force Base – Oklahoma City, Oklahoma
 KTIW (TIW) – Tacoma Narrows Airport – Tacoma, Washington
 KTIX (TIX) – Space Coast Regional Airport – Titusville, Florida
 KTKI (TKI) – McKinney National Airport – McKinney, Texas
 KTKO – Mankato Airport – Mankato, Kansas
 KTKV (TKV) – Tomahawk Regional Airport – Tomahawk, Wisconsin
 KTLH (TLH) – Tallahassee International Airport – Tallahassee, Florida
 KTLR (TLR) – Mefford Airport – Tulare, California
 KTMB (TMB) – Kendall-Tamiami Executive Airport – Miami, Florida
 KTME – Houston Executive Airport – Waller County, Texas
 KTMK (OTK) - Tillamook Airport - Tillamook, Oregon
 KTNP (TNP) – Twentynine Palms Airport – Twentynine Palms, California
 KTNT (TNT) – Dade-Collier Training and Transition Airport – Miami, Florida
 KTNU – Newton Municipal Airport – Newton, Iowa
 KTNX (XSD) – Tonopah Test Range Airport – Tonopah, Nevada
 KTOA (TOA) – Zamperini Field – Torrance, California
 KTOI (TOI) – Troy Municipal Airport – Troy, Alabama
 KTOL (TOL) – Toledo Express Airport – Toledo, Ohio
 KTOP – Billard Municipal Airport – Topeka, Kansas
 KTOR – Torrington Municipal Airport – Torrington, Wyoming
 KTPA (TPA) – Tampa International Airport – Tampa, Florida
 KTPF (TPF) – Peter O. Knight Airport – Davis Island, Tampa, Florida
 KTPH – Tonopah Airport – Tonopah, Nevada
 KTPL (TPL) – Draughon-Miller Central Texas Regional Airport – Temple, Texas
 KTQE – Tekamah Airport – Tekamah, Nebraska
 KTQH - Tahlequah Municipal Airport - Tahlequah, Oklahoma
 KTQK – Scott City Municipal Airport – Scott City, Nebraska
 KTRI (TRI) – Tri-Cities Regional Airport – Blountville, Tennessee
 KTRK (TKF) – Truckee Tahoe Airport – Truckee, California
 KTRM (TRM) – Jacqueline Cochran Regional Airport – Thermal, California
 KTRX – Trenton Municipal Airport – Trenton, Missouri
 KTSP – Tehachapi Municipal Airport – Tehachapi, California
 KTTA (TTA) – Raleigh Executive Jetport – Sanford, North Carolina
 KTTD (TTD) – Portland-Troutdale Airport – Portland, Oregon
 KTTF – Custer Airport – Monroe, Michigan
 KTTN (TTN) – Trenton-Mercer Airport – Trenton, New Jersey
 KTUL (TUL)  – Tulsa International Airport – Tulsa, Oklahoma
 KTUP (TUP) – Tupelo Regional Airport – Tupelo, Mississippi
 KTUS (TUS) – Tucson International Airport – Tucson, Arizona
 KTVC (TVC) – Cherry Capital Airport – Traverse City, Michigan
 KTVF (TVF) – Thief River Falls Regional Airport – Thief River Falls, Minnesota
 KTVL – Lake Tahoe Airport – South Lake Tahoe, California
 KTVR (TVR) – Vicksburg – Tallulah Regional Airport – Tallulah, Louisiana
 KTVY – Tooele Valley Airport (Bolinder Field) – Tooele, Utah
 KTVZ - Tompkinsville Monroe County Airport - Tompkinsville, Kentucky
 KTWF (TWF) – Magic Valley Regional Airport (Joslin Field) – Twin Falls, Idaho
 KTWT – Sturgis Municipal Airport – Sturgis, Kentucky
 KTXK (TXK) – Texarkana Regional Airport (Webb Field) – Texarkana, Arkansas
 KTXW – Mid Valley Airport – Weslaco, Texas
 KTYL (TYZ) – Taylor Airport – Taylor, Arizona
 KTYQ – Indianapolis Executive Airport – Indianapolis, Indiana
 KTYR (TYR) – Tyler Pounds Regional Airport – Tyler, Texas
 KTYS (TYS) – McGhee Tyson Airport – Knoxville, Tennessee
 KTZR – Bolton Field – Columbus, Ohio
 KTZT – Belle Plaine Municipal Airport – Belle Plaine, Iowa

KU 

 KUAO – Aurora State Airport – Aurora, Oregon
 KUBE – Cumberland Municipal Airport – Cumberland, Wisconsin
 KUBS – Columbus-Lowndes County Airport – Columbus, Mississippi
 KUCA – Oneida County Airport – Utica, New York
 KUCP – New Castle Municipal Airport – New Castle, Pennsylvania
 KUDD – Bermuda Dunes Airport – Palm Springs, California
 KUDG – Darlington County Jetport – Darlington, South Carolina
 KUES – Waukesha County Airport (Crites Field) – Waukesha, Wisconsin
 KUGN – Waukegan National Airport – Waukegan, Illinois
 KUIL – Quillayute Airport – Quillayute, Washington
 KUIN – Quincy Regional Airport – Quincy, Illinois
 KUKF – Wilkes County Airport – North Wilkesboro, North Carolina
 KUKI – Ukiah Municipal Airport – Ukiah, California
 KUKL – Coffey County Airport – Burlington, Kansas
 KUKT – Quakertown Airport – Quakertown, Pennsylvania
 KULS – Ulysses Airport – Ulysses, Kansas
 KUMP – Indianapolis Metropolitan Airport – Fishers, Indiana
 KUNI (ATO) – Gordon K. Bush Airport – Athens / Albany, Ohio
 KUNU (UNU) – Dodge County Airport – Juneau, Wisconsin
 KUNV (SCE) – University Park Airport – University Park, Pennsylvania
 KUOS (UOS) – Franklin County Airport – Sewanee, Tennessee
 KUOX (UOX) – University-Oxford Airport – Oxford, Mississippi
 KUTA (UTM) – Tunica Municipal Airport – Tunica, Mississippi
 KUTS (HTV) – Huntsville Municipal Airport – Huntsville, Texas
 KUUU – Newport State Airport – Newport, Rhode Island
 KUVA (UVA) – Garner Field – Uvalde, Texas
 KUZA – Rock Hill/York County Airport (Bryant Field) – Rock Hill, South Carolina

KV 

 KVAY – South Jersey Regional Airport – Mount Holly, New Jersey
 KVBG – Vandenberg Air Force Base – Lompoc, California
 KVBT – Bentonville Municipal Airport – Bentonville, Arkansas
 KVBW – Bridgewater Airport – Bridgewater, Virginia
 KVCB – Nut Tree Airport – Vacaville, California
 KVCT (VCT) – Victoria Regional Airport – Victoria, Texas
 KVCV (VCV) – Southern California Logistics Airport – Victorville, California
 KVDF – Tampa Executive Airport – Tampa, Florida
 KVEL (VEL) – Vernal Regional Airport – Vernal, Utah
 KVER – Jesse Viertel Memorial Airport – Boonville, Missouri
 KVES – Darke County Airport – Versailles, Ohio
 KVGT (VGT) – North Las Vegas Airport – Las Vegas, Nevada
 KVIH (VIH) – Rolla National Airport – Rolla / Vichy, Missouri
 KVIS (VIS) – Visalia Municipal Airport – Visalia, California
 KVJI – Virginia Highlands Airport – Abingdon, Virginia
 KVKS – Vicksburg Municipal Airport – Vicksburg, Mississippi
 KVKX – Potomac Airfield – Friendly, Maryland
 KVLD (VLD) – Valdosta Regional Airport – Valdosta, Georgia
 KVLL – Oakland-Troy Airport – Troy, Michigan
 KVMR – Davidson Airport – Vermillion, South Dakota
 KVNC (VNC) – Venice Municipal Airport – Venice, Florida
 KVNY (VNY) – Van Nuys Airport – Van Nuys, California
 KVPS (VPS) – Destin-Fort Walton Beach Airport / Eglin Air Force Base – Valparaiso, Florida
 KVPZ – Porter County Regional Airport – Valparaiso, Indiana
 KVQQ (VQQ) – Cecil Airport – Jacksonville, Florida
 KVRB (VRB) – Vero Beach Regional Airport – Vero Beach, Florida
 KVSF (VSF) – Hartness State Airport – Springfield, Vermont
 KVTA – Newark-Heath Airport – Newark, Ohio
 KVTN – Miller Field – Valentine, Nebraska
 KVUJ – Stanly County Airport – Albemarle, North Carolina
 KVUO – Pearson Field – Vancouver, Washington
 KVVS – Joseph A. Hardy Connellsville Airport – Connellsville, Pennsylvania
 KVYS – Illinois Valley Regional Airport (Walter A. Duncan Field) – Peru, Illinois

KW 

 KWAL – Wallops Flight Facility – Wallops Island, Virginia
 KWAY – Greene County Airport – Waynesburg, Pennsylvania
 KWBW (WBW) – Wilkes-Barre Wyoming Valley Airport – Wilkes-Barre, Pennsylvania
 KWDG (WDG) - Woodring Airport - Enid, Oklahoma
 KWHP – Whiteman Airport – Los Angeles, California
 KWJF (WJF) – General William J. Fox Airfield – Lancaster, California
 KWLD (WLD) – Strother Field – Winfield, Kansas
 KWLW (WLW) – Willows-Glenn County Airport – Willows, California
 KWMC (WMC) – Winnemucca Municipal Airport – Winnemucca, Nevada
 KWRB – Robins Air Force Base – Warner Robins, Georgia
 KWRI – McGuire Air Force Base – Wrightstown, New Jersey
 KWRL – Worland Municipal Airport – Worland, Wyoming
 KWST (WST) – Westerly State Airport – Westerly, Rhode Island
 KWVI (WVI) – Watsonville Municipal Airport – Watsonville, California
 KWVL – Waterville Robert LaFleur Airport – Waterville, Maine
 KWWD – Cape May Airport – Wildwood, New Jersey
 KWWR (WWR) - West Woodward Airport - Woodward, Oklahoma
 KWYS (WYS) – Yellowstone Airport – West Yellowstone, Montana

KX 

 KXBP – Bridgeport Municipal Airport – Bridgeport, Texas
 KXFL – Flagler County Airport – Bunnell, Florida
 KXLL – Allentown Queen City Municipal Airport – Allentown, Pennsylvania
 KXMR – Cape Canaveral Space Force Station – Cocoa Beach, Florida
 KXNA (XNA) – Northwest Arkansas Regional Airport – Highfill, Arkansas
 KXNO – North Air Force Auxiliary Field – North, South Carolina
 KXNX – Sumner County Regional Airport – Gallatin, Tennessee
 KXTA (XTA) – Homey Airport – Groom Lake, Nevada
 KXVG – Longville Municipal Airport – Longville, Minnesota
 KXWA (XWA) - Williston Basin International Airport - Williston, North Dakota

KY 

 KYIP (YIP) – Willow Run Airport – Ypsilanti, Michigan
 KYKM (YKM) – Yakima Air Terminal (McAllister Field) – Yakima, Washington
 KYKN (YKN) – Chan Gurney Municipal Airport – Yankton, South Dakota
 KYNG (YNG) – Youngstown-Warren Regional Airport – Youngstown / Warren, Ohio

KZ 

 KZEF – Elkin Municipal Airport – Elkin, North Carolina
 KZER – Schuylkill County Airport (Joe Zerbey Field) – Pottsville, Pennsylvania
 KZPH (ZPH) – Zephyrhills Municipal Airport – Zephyrhills, Florida
 KZUN – Black Rock Airport – Zuni Pueblo, New Mexico (closed 2018)
 KZZV (ZZV) – Zanesville Municipal Airport – Zanesville, Ohio

References

 
 FAA Airport Data (Form 5010) from FAA's National Flight Data Center (NFDC). Also available from AirportIQ 5010.
 Great Circle Mapper - IATA, ICAO and FAA airport codes
 Aviation Safety Network - IATA and ICAO codes

External links
 Meteorological station lookup at the National Weather Service

K
ICAO code: K